= Yuluk =

Yuluk Юлук
- Village
- Location within Bashkortostan Location within Russia
- Coordinates: 52°31′N 57°47′E
- Country: Russia
- Region: Bashkortostan
- District: Baymaksky District

Population (2010)
  - Total: 470
- Time zone: UTC+5:00

Yuluk (Russian: Юлук; Bashkir: Юлыҡ, Yulıq) is a rural locality (a village) in Baymaksky District, Bashkortostan, Russia. The population was 470 as of 2010. There are 9 streets.

== Geography ==
Yuluk is located 46 km west of Baymak (the district's administrative centre) by road. Yumashevo is the nearest rural locality.
