= Nizhneyaikbayevo =

Nizhneyaikbayevo Нижнеяикбаево
- Village
- Location within Bashkortostan Location within Russia
- Coordinates: 52°46′N 58°02′E
- Country: Russia
- Region: Bashkortostan
- District: Baymaksky District
- Time zone: UTC+5:00

Nizhneyaikbayevo (Russian: Нижнеяикбаево; Bashkir: Түбәнге Яйыҡбай, Tübänge Yayıqbay) is a rural locality (a village) in Nigamatovsky Selsoviet, Baymaksky District, Bashkortostan, Russia. The population was 123 as of 2010. There are 2 streets.

== Geography ==
Nizhneyaikbayevo is located 32 km northwest of Baymak (the district's administrative centre) by road. Nigamatovo is the nearest rural locality.
