= Krepostnoy Zilair =

Krepostnoy Zilair Крепостной Зилаир
- Village
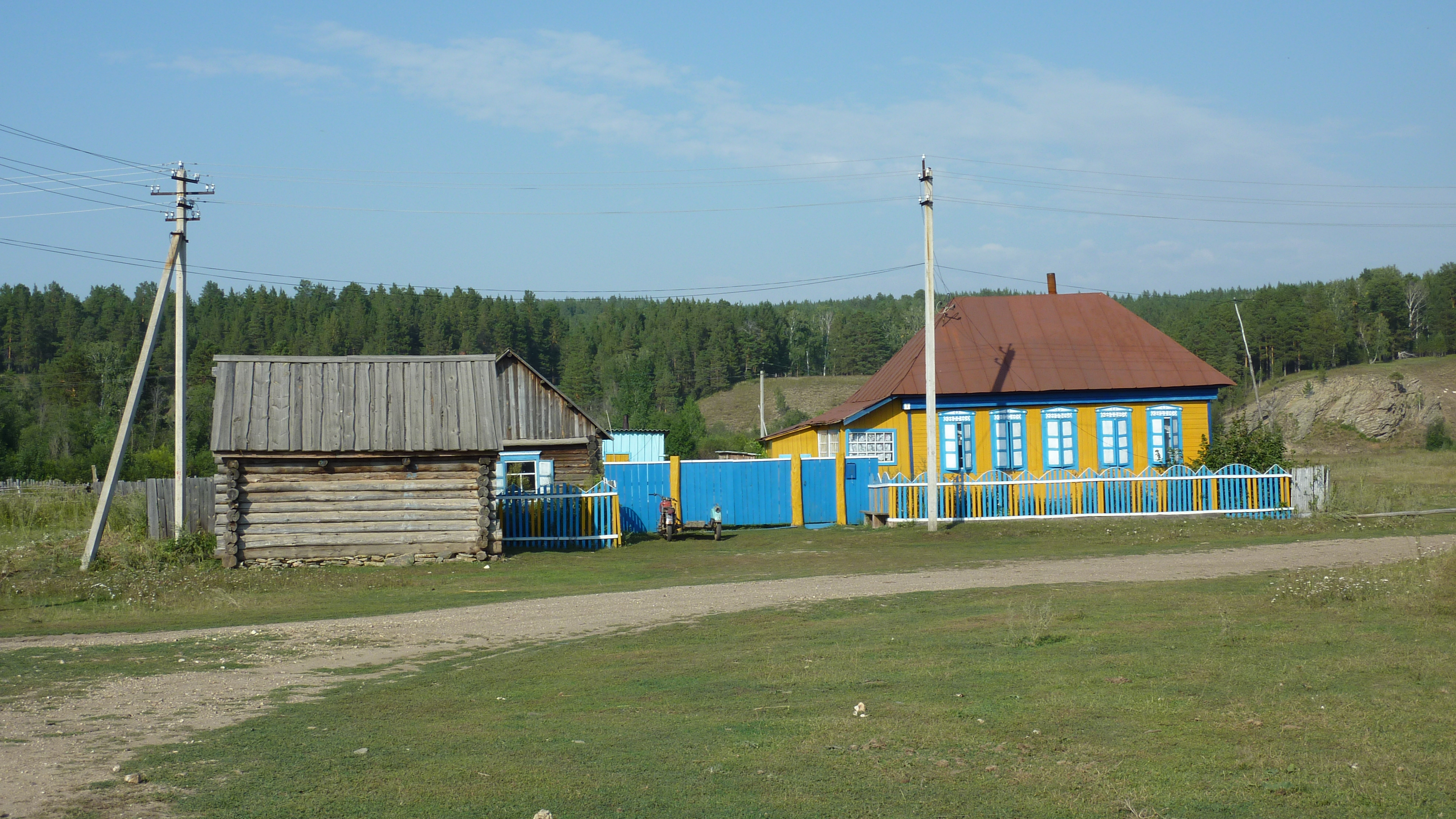

- Location within Bashkortostan Location within Russia
- Coordinates: 52°25′N 57°40′E
- Country: Russia
- Region: Bashkortostan
- District: Baymaksky District
- Time zone: UTC+5:00

Krepostnoy Zilair (Russian: Крепостной Зилаир; Bashkir: Крепостной Йылайыр, Krepostnoy Yılayır) is a rural locality (a village) in Ishberdinsky Selsoviet, Baymaksky District, Bashkortostan, Russia. The population was 142 as of 2010. There are 5 streets.

== Geography ==
Krepostnoy Zilair is located 65 km southwest of Baymak (the district's administrative centre) by road. Ishberda is the nearest rural locality.
