= Karyshkino =

Karyshkino Карышкино
- Village
- Location within Bashkortostan Location within Russia
- Coordinates: 52°31′N 58°36′E
- Country: Russia
- Region: Bashkortostan
- District: Baymaksky District
- Time zone: UTC+5:00

Karyshkino (Russian: Карышкино; Bashkir: Кәрешкә, Käreşkä) is a rural locality (a village) in Tatlybayevsky Selsoviet, Baymaksky District, Bashkortostan, Russia. The population was 418 as of 2010. There are 5 streets.

== Geography ==
Karyshkino is located 41 km southeast of Baymak (the district's administrative centre) by road. Abdrakhmanovo is the nearest rural locality.
