= Urgaza =

Urgaza Ургаза
- Selo
- Location within Bashkortostan Location within Russia
- Coordinates: 52°20′N 58°37′E
- Country: Russia
- Region: Bashkortostan
- District: Baymaksky District
- Time zone: UTC+5:00

Urgaza (Russian: Ургаза; Bashkir: Урғаҙа, Urğaźa) is a rural locality (a selo) and the administrative centre of Zilairsky Selsoviet, Baymaksky District, Bashkortostan, Russia. The population was 2,257 as of 2010. There are 22 streets.

== Geography ==
Urgaza is located 50 km southeast of Baymak (the district's administrative centre) by road. Ishmukhametovo is the nearest rural locality.
