= Islamovo =

Islamovo Исламово
- Village
- Location within Bashkortostan Location within Russia
- Coordinates: 52°29′N 57°51′E
- Country: Russia
- Region: Bashkortostan
- District: Baymaksky District
- Time zone: UTC+5:00

Islamovo (Russian: Исламово; Bashkir: Ислам, İslam) is a rural locality (a village) in Yumashevsky Selsoviet, Baymaksky District, Bashkortostan, Russia. The population was 4 as of 2010. There is 1 street.

== Geography ==
Islamovo is located 39 km southwest of Baymak (the district's administrative centre) by road. Yumashevo is the nearest rural locality.
