= Kultaban =

Kultaban Культабан
- Village
- Location within Bashkortostan Location within Russia
- Coordinates: 52°37′N 58°42′E
- Country: Russia
- Region: Bashkortostan
- District: Baymaksky District
- Time zone: UTC+5:00

Kultaban (Russian: Культабан; Bashkir: Күлтабан, Kültaban) is a rural locality (a village) in Zilairsky Selsoviet, Baymaksky District, Bashkortostan, Russia. The population was 364 as of 2010. There are 3 streets.

== Geography ==
Kultaban is located 44 km east of Baymak (the district's administrative centre) by road. Sibay is the nearest rural locality.
