= Yaratovo =

Yaratovo Яратово
- Selo
- Location within Bashkortostan Location within Russia
- Coordinates: 52°34′N 57°57′E
- Country: Russia
- Region: Bashkortostan
- District: Baymaksky District
- Time zone: UTC+5:00

Yaratovo (Russian: Яратово; Bashkir: Ярат, Yarat) is a rural locality (a selo) and the administrative centre of Yaratovsky Selsoviet, Baymaksky District, Bashkortostan, Russia. The population was 516 as of 2010. There are 19 streets.

== Geography ==
Yaratovo is located 36 km west of Baymak (the district's administrative centre) by road. Gumerovo is the nearest rural locality.
