= Ishmukhametovo =

Ishmukhametovo Ишмухаметово
- Selo
- Location within Bashkortostan Location within Russia
- Coordinates: 52°23′N 58°28′E
- Country: Russia
- Region: Bashkortostan
- District: Baymaksky District
- Time zone: UTC+5:00

Ishmukhametovo (Russian: Ишмухаметово; Bashkir: Ишмөхәмәт, İşmöxämät) is a rural locality (a selo) and the administrative centre of Ishmukhametovsky Selsoviet, Baymaksky District, Bashkortostan, Russia. The population was 526 as of 2010. There are 8 streets.

== Geography ==
Ishmukhametovo is located 37 km southeast of Baymak (the district's administrative centre) by road. Yangazino is the nearest rural locality.
