= Derevnya Kozhzavoda =

Derevnya Kozhzavoda Деревня Кожзавода
- Village
- Location within Bashkortostan Location within Russia
- Coordinates: 52°58′N 58°05′E
- Country: Russia
- Region: Bashkortostan
- District: Baymaksky District
- Time zone: UTC+5:00

Derevnya Kozhzavoda (Russian: Деревня Кожзавода; Bashkir: Күнзавод, Künzavod) is a rural locality (a village) in Temyasovsky Selsoviet, Baymaksky District, Bashkortostan, Russia. The population was 148 as of 2010. There are 4 streets.

== Geography ==
The village is located 57 km north of Baymak (the district's administrative centre) by road. Aminevo is the nearest rural locality.
