= Mukasovo 2-e =

Mukasovo 2-e Мукасово 2-е
- Village
- Location within Bashkortostan Location within Russia
- Coordinates: 52°46′N 58°35′E
- Country: Russia
- Region: Bashkortostan
- District: Baymaksky District
- Time zone: UTC+5:00

Mukasovo 2-e (Russian: Мукасово 2-е; Bashkir: 2-се Моҡас, 2-se Moqas) is a rural locality (a village) in Mukasovsky Selsoviet, Baymaksky District, Bashkortostan, Russia. The population was 32 as of 2010. There are 2 streets.

== Geography ==
Mukasovo 2-e is located 44 km northeast of Baymak (the district's administrative centre) by road. Arkaim is the nearest rural locality.
