= Mukasovo 1-e =

Mukasovo 1-e Мукасово 1-е
- Village
- Location within Bashkortostan Location within Russia
- Coordinates: 52°47′N 58°37′E
- Country: Russia
- Region: Bashkortostan
- District: Baymaksky District
- Time zone: UTC+5:00

Mukasovo 1-e (Russian: Мукасово 1-е; Bashkir: 1-се Моҡас, 1-se Moqas) is a rural locality (a village) in Mukasovsky Selsoviet, Baymaksky District, Bashkortostan, Russia. The population was 114 as of 2010. There are 3 streets.

== Geography ==
Mukasovo 1-e is located 46 km northeast of Baymak (the district's administrative centre) by road. Mukasovo 2-e is the nearest rural locality.
