= Baimovo, Baymaksky District, Republic of Bashkortostan =

Baimovo Баимово
- Village
- Location within Bashkortostan Location within Russia
- Coordinates: 52°51′N 57°59′E
- Country: Russia
- Region: Bashkortostan
- District: Baymaksky District
- Time zone: UTC+5:00

Baimovo (Russian: Баимово; Bashkir: Байым, Bayım) is a rural locality (a village) in Nigamatovsky Selsoviet, Baymaksky District, Bashkortostan, Russia. The population was 487 as of 2010. There are 3 streets.

== Geography ==
Baimovo is located 42 km northwest of Baymak (the district's administrative centre) by road. 2-ye Itkulovo is the nearest rural locality.
