= Taktagulovo =

Taktagulovo Тактагулово
- Village
- Location within Bashkortostan Location within Russia
- Coordinates: 53°00′N 58°23′E
- Country: Russia
- Region: Bashkortostan
- District: Baymaksky District
- Time zone: UTC+5:00

Taktagulovo (Russian: Тактагулово; Bashkir: Туҡтағол, Tuqtağol) is a rural locality (a village) in Kuseyevsky Selsoviet, Baymaksky District, Bashkortostan, Russia. The population was 13 as of 2010. There is 1 street.

== Geography ==
Taktagulovo is located 78 km north of Baymak (the district's administrative centre) by road. Kuseyevo is the nearest rural locality.
