= Bilyalovo =

Bilyalovo Билялово
- Selo
- Location within Bashkortostan Location within Russia
- Coordinates: 53°04′N 58°13′E
- Country: Russia
- Region: Bashkortostan
- District: Baymaksky District
- Time zone: UTC+5:00

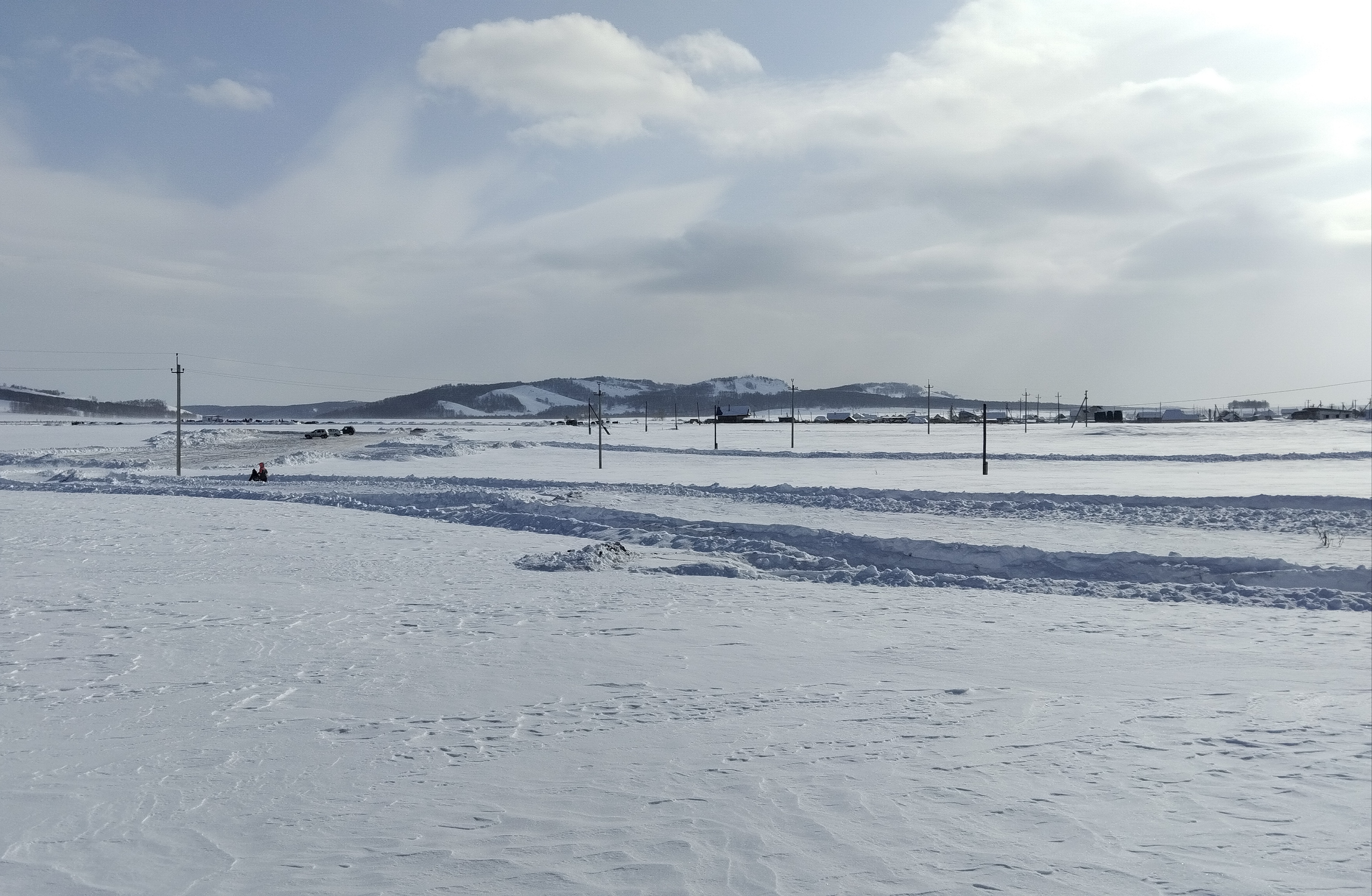
Mountains in Bilyalovo

Bilyalovo (Russian: Билялово; Bashkir: Билал, Bilal) is a rural locality (a selo) and the administrative centre of Bilyalovsky Selsoviet, Baymaksky District, Bashkortostan, Russia. The population was 711 as of 2010. There are 9 streets.

== Geography ==
Bilyalovo is located 67 km north of Baymak (the district's administrative centre) by road. Semyonovo is the nearest rural locality.
