= Kuvatovo =

Kuvatovo Куватово
- Village
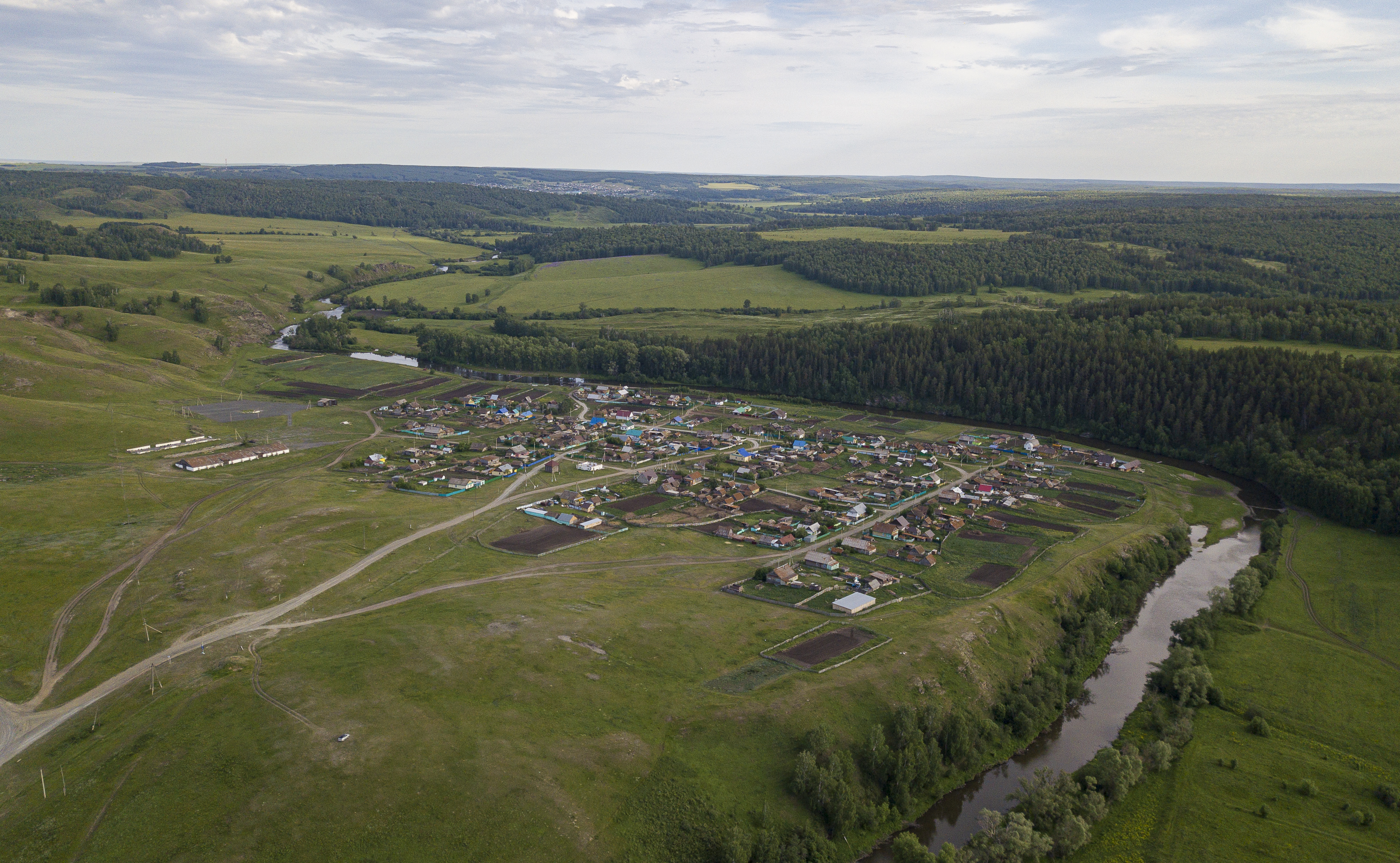
- Aerial view of Kuvatovo village. Bashkiria. Russia

- Location within Bashkortostan Location within Russia
- Coordinates: 52°24′N 57°51′E
- Country: Russia
- Region: Bashkortostan
- District: Baymaksky District
- Time zone: UTC+5:00

Kuvatovo (Russian: Куватово; Bashkir: Ҡыуат, Qıwat) is a rural locality (a village) in Abdulkarimovsky Selsoviet, Baymaksky District, Bashkortostan, Russia. The population was 198 as of 2010. There are 6 streets.

== Geography ==
Kuvatovo is located 44 km southwest of Baymak (the district's administrative centre) by road. Abdulkarimovo is the nearest rural locality.
