= Nigamatovo =

Nigamatovo Нигаматово
- Selo
- Location within Bashkortostan Location within Russia
- Coordinates: 52°47′N 58°02′E
- Country: Russia
- Region: Bashkortostan
- District: Baymaksky District
- Time zone: UTC+5:00

Nigamatovo (Russian: Нигаматово; Bashkir: Ниғәмәт, Niğämät) is a rural locality (a selo) and the administrative centre of Nigamatovsky Selsoviet, Baymaksky District, Bashkortostan, Russia. The population was 838 as of 2010. There are 10 streets.

== Geography ==
Nigamatovo is located 30 km northwest of Baymak (the district's administrative centre) by road. Nizhneyaikbayevo is the nearest rural locality.
