= Chingizovo =

Chingizovo Чингизово
- Village
- Location within Bashkortostan Location within Russia
- Coordinates: 52°39′N 58°00′E
- Country: Russia
- Region: Bashkortostan
- District: Baymaksky District
- Time zone: UTC+5:00

Chingizovo (Russian: Чингизово; Bashkir: Сыңғыҙ, romanized: Sıŋğıð) is a rural locality (a village) in Tavlykayevsky Selsoviet, Baymaksky District, Bashkortostan, Russia. The population was 573 as of 2010. There are 9 streets.

== Geography ==
Chingizovo is located 32 km northwest of Baymak (the district's administrative centre) by road. Buranbayevo is the nearest rural locality.
