= Oktyabr, Baymaksky District, Bashkortostan =

Oktyabr Октябрь
- Village
- Location within Bashkortostan Location within Russia
- Coordinates: 52°23′N 58°47′E
- Country: Russia
- Region: Bashkortostan
- District: Baymaksky District
- Time zone: UTC+5:00

Oktyabr (Russian: Октябрь) is a rural locality (a village) in Zilairsky Selsoviet, Baymaksky District, Bashkortostan, Russia. The population was 201 as of 2010. There are 3 streets.

== Geography ==
Oktyabr is located 73 km southeast of Baymak (the district's administrative centre) by road. Sosnovka is the nearest rural locality.
