= Munasipovo =

Munasipovo Мунасипово
- Village
- Location within Bashkortostan Location within Russia
- Coordinates: 52°31′N 58°22′E
- Country: Russia
- Region: Bashkortostan
- District: Baymaksky District
- Time zone: UTC+5:00

Munasipovo (Russian: Мунасипово; Bashkir: Монасип, Monasip) is a rural locality (a village) in Semyonovsky Selsoviet, Baymaksky District, Bashkortostan, Russia. The population was 83 as of 2010. There are 2 streets.

== Geography ==
Munasipovo is located 15 km southeast of Baymak (the district's administrative centre) by road. Semyonovskoye is the nearest rural locality.
