= Nizhneidrisovo =

Nizhneidrisovo Нижнеидрисово
- Village
- Location within Bashkortostan Location within Russia
- Coordinates: 52°56′N 58°04′E
- Country: Russia
- Region: Bashkortostan
- District: Baymaksky District
- Time zone: UTC+5:00

Nizhneidrisovo (Russian: Нижнеидрисово; Bashkir: Түбәнге Иҙрис, Tübänge İźris) is a rural locality (a village) in Kulchurovsky Selsoviet, Baymaksky District, Bashkortostan, Russia. The population was 365 as of 2010. There are 4 streets.

== Geography ==
Nizhneidrisovo is located 12 km north of Baymak (the district's administrative centre) by road.
