= Gadelbayevo =

Gadelbayevo Гадельбаево
- Village
- Location within Bashkortostan Location within Russia
- Coordinates: 52°36′N 57°56′E
- Country: Russia
- Region: Bashkortostan
- District: Baymaksky District
- Time zone: UTC+5:00

Gadelbayevo (Russian: Гадельбаево; Bashkir: Ғәҙелбай, Ğäźelbay) is a rural locality (a village) in Itkulovsky 1st Selsoviet, Baymaksky District, Bashkortostan, Russia. The population was 309 as of 2010. There are 5 streets.

== Geography ==
Gadelbayevo is located 31 km west of Baymak (the district's administrative centre) by road. 1-ye Itkulovo is the nearest rural locality.
