= Kalinino, Baymaksky District, Republic of Bashkortostan =

Kalinino Калинино
- Village
- Location within Bashkortostan Location within Russia
- Coordinates: 52°42′N 58°45′E
- Country: Russia
- Region: Bashkortostan
- District: Baymaksky District
- Time zone: UTC+5:00

Kalinino (Russian: Калинино) is a rural locality (a village) in Sibaysky Selsoviet, Baymaksky District, Bashkortostan, Russia. The population was 388 as of 2010. There are 2 streets.

== Geography ==
Kalinino is located 41 km northeast of Baymak (the district's administrative centre) by road. Sibay is the nearest rural locality.
