= Akmurun =

Akmurun Акмурун
- Selo
- Location within Bashkortostan Location within Russia
- Coordinates: 52°32′N 58°07′E
- Country: Russia
- Region: Bashkortostan
- District: Baymaksky District
- Time zone: UTC+5:00

Akmurun (Russian: Акмурун; Bashkir: Аҡморон, Aqmoron) is a rural locality (a selo) and the administrative centre of Akmurunsky Selsoviet, Baymaksky District, Bashkortostan, Russia. The population was 1,430 as of 2010. There are 10 streets.

== Geography ==
Akmurun is located 20 km southwest of Baymak (the district's administrative centre) by road. Aktau is the nearest rural locality.
