= 1st Itkulovo =

1st Itkulovo 1-е Иткулово 1-се Этҡол 1-se Etqol
- Village
- Location within Bashkortostan Location within Russia
- Coordinates: 52.631111°N 57.958333°E
- Country: Russia
- Region: Bashkortostan
- District: Baymaksky District
- Time zone: UTC+05:00

1st Itkulovo (Russian: 1-е Иткулово; Bashkir: 1-се Этҡол, 1-se Etqol) is a rural locality (a selo) and the administrative centre of Itkulovsky 1st Selsoviet, Baymaksky District, the Republic of Bashkortostan, Russia. The population was 926 as of 2010.

== Geography ==
1st Itkulovo is located 28 km west of Baymak (the district's administrative centre) by road. Buranbayevo is the nearest rural locality.

== Ethnicity ==
The village is inhabited by Bashkirs.

== Streets ==
- A. Nigmatullina
- Azamata
- Bairamgulova
- Gagarina
- Z. Validi
- Lenina
- Mira
- Molodezhnaya
- Pobedy
- S. Yulaeva
- Sadovaya
- Yamash
