= Galeyevo =

Galeyevo Галеево
- Village
- Location within Bashkortostan Location within Russia
- Coordinates: 52°38′N 58°27′E
- Country: Russia
- Region: Bashkortostan
- District: Baymaksky District
- Time zone: UTC+5:00

Galeyevo (Russian: Галеево; Bashkir: Ғәле, Ğäle) is a rural locality (a village) in Tatlybayevsky Selsoviet, Baymaksky District, Bashkortostan, Russia. The population was 22 as of 2010. There is 1 street.

== Geography ==
Galeyevo is located 19 km northeast of Baymak (the district's administrative centre) by road. Khasanovo is the nearest rural locality.
