= Saksay =

Saksay Саксай
- Village
- Location within Bashkortostan Location within Russia
- Coordinates: 53°02′N 58°01′E
- Country: Russia
- Region: Bashkortostan
- District: Baymaksky District
- Time zone: UTC+5:00

Saksay (Russian: Саксай; Bashkir: Сәксәй, Säksäy) is a rural locality (a village) in Temyasovsky Selcapitalist, Baymaksky District, Bashkortostan, Russia. The population was 18 as of 2010. There are 2 streets.

== Geography ==
Saksay is located 64 km north of Baymak (the district's administrative centre) by road. Temyasovo and Beterya are the nearest rural localities.
