= Karatal, Baymaksky District, Republic of Bashkortostan =

Karatal Каратал
- Village
- Location within Bashkortostan Location within Russia
- Coordinates: 52°37′N 58°06′E
- Country: Russia
- Region: Bashkortostan
- District: Baymaksky District
- Time zone: UTC+5:00

Karatal (Russian: Каратал; Bashkir: Ҡаратал, Qaratal) is a rural locality (a village) in Akmurunsky Selsoviet, Baymaksky District, Bashkortostan, Russia. The population was 512 as of 2010. There are 4 streets.

== Geography ==
Karatal is located 19 km northwest of Baymak (the district's administrative centre) by road. Buranbayevo is the nearest rural locality.
