= Verkhnetavlykayevo =

Verkhnetavlykayevo Верхнетавлыкаево
- Selo
- Location within Bashkortostan Location within Russia
- Coordinates: 52°42′N 58°05′E
- Country: Russia
- Region: Bashkortostan
- District: Baymaksky District
- Time zone: UTC+5:00

Verkhnetavlykayevo (Russian: Верхнетавлыкаево; Bashkir: Үрге Таулыҡай, Ürge Tawlıqay) is a rural locality (a selo) and the administrative centre of Tavlykayevsky Selsoviet, Baymaksky District, Bashkortostan, Russia. The population was 616 as of 2010. There are 9 streets.

== Geography ==
Verkhnetavlykayevo is located 23 km northwest of Baymak (the district's administrative centre) by road. Nizhnetavlykayevo is the nearest rural locality.
