= Sakmar =

Sakmar Сакмар
- Village
- Location within Bashkortostan Location within Russia
- Coordinates: 52°49′N 58°08′E
- Country: Russia
- Region: Bashkortostan
- District: Baymaksky District
- Time zone: UTC+5:00

Sakmar (Russian: Сакмар; Bashkir: Һаҡмар, Haqmar) is a rural locality (a village) in Temyasovsky Selsoviet, Baymaksky District, Bashkortostan, Russia. The population was 472 as of 2010. There are 7 streets.

== Geography ==
Sakmar is located 34 km north of Baymak (the district's administrative centre) by road. Nigamatovo is the nearest rural locality.
