= Burzyan-Yelga =

Burzyan-Yelga Бурзян-Елга
- Village
- Location within Bashkortostan Location within Russia
- Coordinates: 52°24′N 57°33′E
- Country: Russia
- Region: Bashkortostan
- District: Baymaksky District
- Time zone: UTC+5:00

Burzyan-Yelga (Russian: Бурзян-Елга; Bashkir: Бөрйәнйылға, Böryänyılğa) is a rural locality (a village) in Ishberdinsky Selsoviet, Baymaksky District, Bashkortostan, Russia. The population was 119 as of 2010. There are 2 streets.

== Geography ==
Burzyan-Yelga is located 72 km southwest of Baymak (the district's administrative centre) by road. Ishberda is the nearest rural locality.
