= Verkhneyaikbayevo =

Verkhneyaikbayevo Верхнеяикбаево
- Village
- Location within Bashkortostan Location within Russia
- Coordinates: 52°46′N 58°00′E
- Country: Russia
- Region: Bashkortostan
- District: Baymaksky District
- Time zone: UTC+5:00

Verkhneyaikbayevo (Russian: Верхнеяикбаево; Bashkir: Үрге Яйыҡбай, Ürge Yayıqbay) is a rural locality (a village) in Nigamatovsky Selsoviet, Baymaksky District, Bashkortostan, Russia. The population was 390 as of 2010. There are 6 streets.

== Geography ==
Verkhneyaikbayevo is located 33 km northwest of Baymak (the district's administrative centre) by road. Nigamatovo is the nearest rural locality.
