= Verkhnetagirovo =

Verkhnetagirovo Верхнетагирово
- Village
- Location within Bashkortostan Location within Russia
- Coordinates: 53°02′N 58°10′E
- Country: Russia
- Region: Bashkortostan
- District: Baymaksky District
- Time zone: UTC+5:00

Verkhnetagirovo (Russian: Верхнетагирово; Bashkir: Үрге Таһир, Ürge Tahir) is a rural locality (a village) in Temyasovsky Selsoviet, Baymaksky District, Bashkortostan, Russia. The population was 99 as of 2010. There are 2 streets.

== Geography ==
Verkhnetagirovo is located 63 km north of Baymak (the district's administrative centre) by road. Nizhnetagirovo is the nearest rural locality.
