= Verkhnemambetovo =

Verkhnemambetovo Верхнемамбетово
- Village
- Location within Bashkortostan Location within Russia
- Coordinates: 52°31′N 58°12′E
- Country: Russia
- Region: Bashkortostan
- District: Baymaksky District
- Time zone: UTC+5:00

Verkhnemambetovo (Russian: Верхнемамбетово; Bashkir: Үрге Мәмбәт, Ürge Mämbät) is a rural locality (a village) in Akmurunsky Selsoviet, Baymaksky District, Bashkortostan, Russia. The population was 162 as of 2010. There are 4 streets.

== Geography ==
Verkhnemambetovo is located 14 km southwest of Baymak (the district's administrative centre) by road. Baymak is the nearest rural locality.
