= Khasanovo, Baymaksky District, Republic of Bashkortostan =

Khasanovo Хасаново
- Village
- Location within Bashkortostan Location within Russia
- Coordinates: 52°39′N 58°34′E
- Country: Russia
- Region: Bashkortostan
- District: Baymaksky District
- Time zone: UTC+5:00

Khasanovo (Russian: Хасаново; Bashkir: Хәсән, Xäsän) is a rural locality (a village) in Tatlybayevsky Selsoviet, Baymaksky District, Bashkortostan, Russia. The population was 57 as of 2010. There are 6 streets.

== Geography ==
Khasanovo is located 25 km northeast of Baymak (the district's administrative centre) by road. Yanzigitovo is the nearest rural locality.
