= Nizhnetagirovo =

Nizhnetagirovo Нижнетагирово
- Village
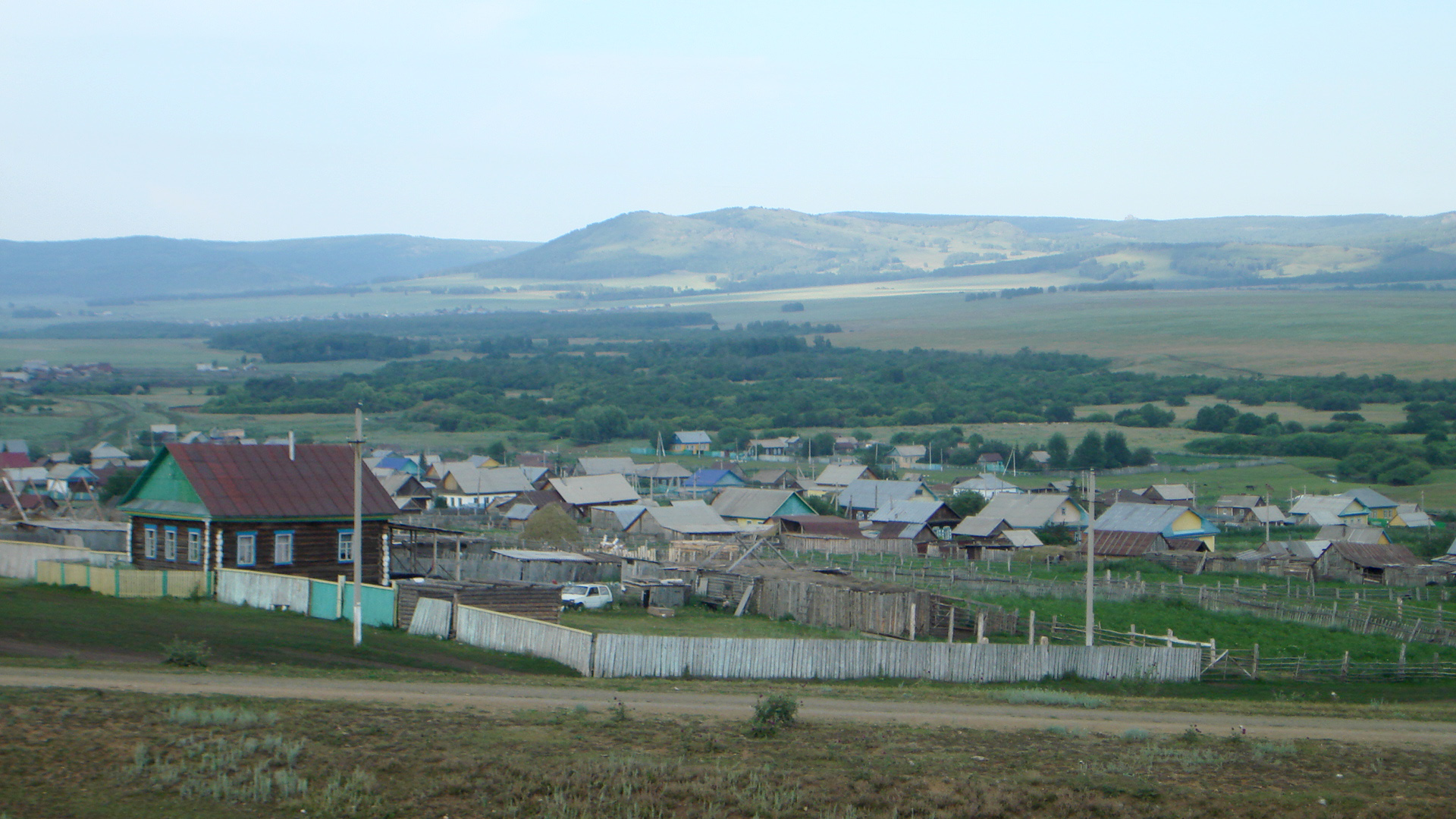

- Location within Bashkortostan Location within Russia
- Coordinates: 53°02′N 58°09′E
- Country: Russia
- Region: Bashkortostan
- District: Baymaksky District
- Time zone: UTC+5:00

Nizhnetagirovo (Russian: Нижнетагирово; Bashkir: Түбәнге Таһир, Tübänge Tahir) is a rural locality (a village) in Temyasovsky Selsoviet, Baymaksky District, Bashkortostan, Russia. The population was 498 as of 2010. There are 5 streets.

== Geography ==
Nizhnetagirovo is located 62 km north of Baymak (the district's administrative centre) by road. Bilyalovo is the nearest rural locality.
