= Bakhtigareyevo =

Bakhtigareyevo Бахтигареево
- Village
- Location within Bashkortostan Location within Russia
- Coordinates: 52°32′N 58°29′E
- Country: Russia
- Region: Bashkortostan
- District: Baymaksky District
- Time zone: UTC+5:00

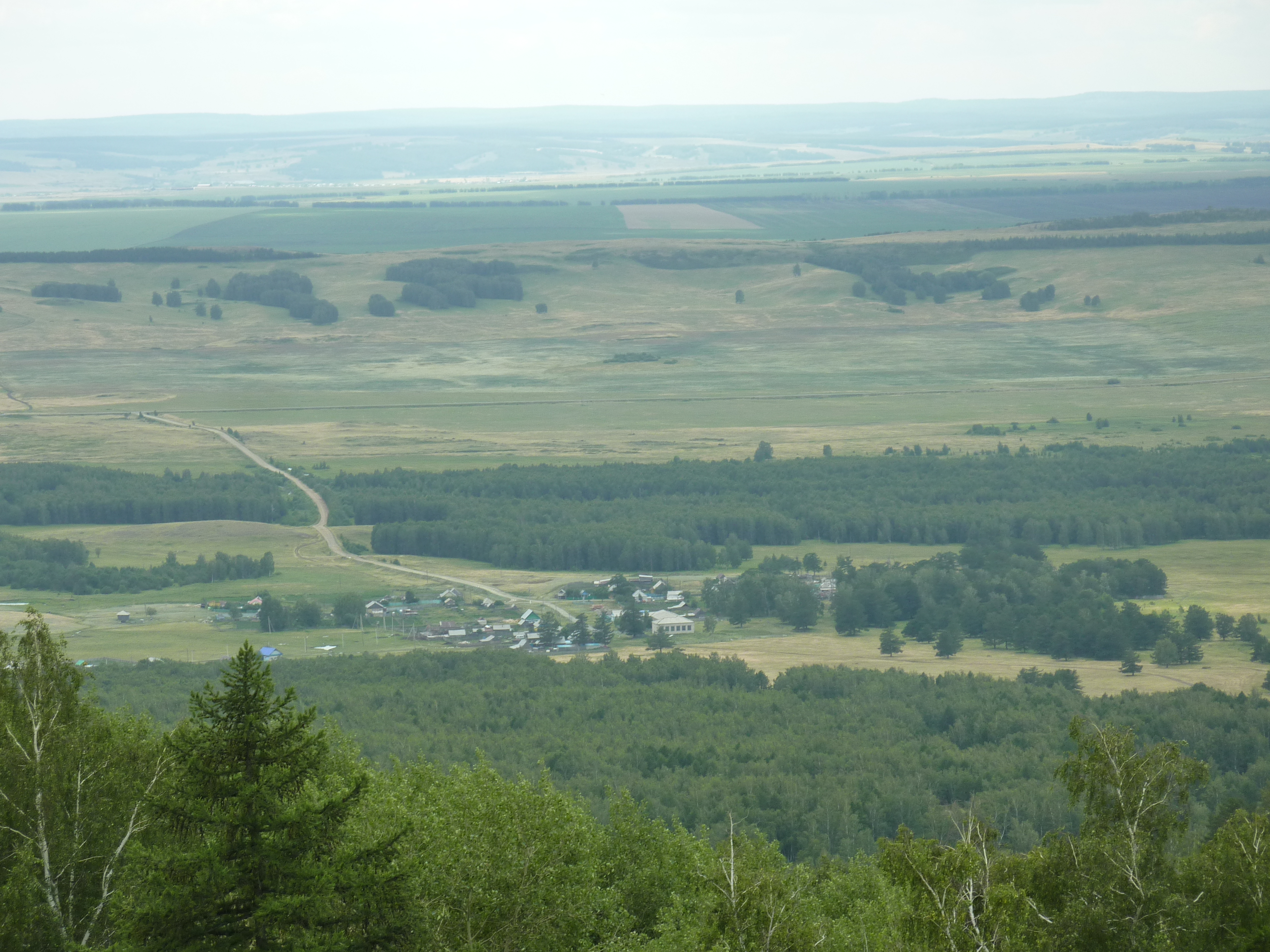
Bakhtigareevo - panoramio

Bakhtigareyevo (Russian: Бахтигареево; Bashkir: Бәхтегәрәй, Bäxtegäräy) is a rural locality (a village) in Ishmukhametovsky Selsoviet, Baymaksky District, Bashkortostan, Russia. The population was 5 as of 2010.

== Geography ==
It is located 13 km from Baymak and 16 km from Ishmukhametovo.
