= Zelimovo =

Zelimovo Зелимово
- Village
- Location within Bashkortostan Location within Russia
- Coordinates: 52°35′N 57°41′E
- Country: Russia
- Region: Bashkortostan
- District: Baymaksky District
- Time zone: UTC+5:00

Zelimovo (Russian: Зелимово; Bashkir: Йылым, Yılım) is a rural locality (a village) in Ishberdinsky Selsoviet, Baymaksky District, Bashkortostan, Russia. The population was 254 as of 2010. There are 5 streets.

== Geography ==
Zelimovo is located 62 km west of Baymak (the district's administrative centre) by road. Yuluk is the nearest rural locality.
