= Kazanka, Baymaksky District, Republic of Bashkortostan =

Kazanka Казанка
- Village
- Location within Bashkortostan Location within Russia
- Coordinates: 52°47′N 58°43′E
- Country: Russia
- Region: Bashkortostan
- District: Baymaksky District

Population (2010)
  - Total: 417
- Time zone: UTC+5:00

Kazanka (Russian: Казанка) is a rural locality (a village) in Mukasovsky Selsoviet, Baymaksky District, Bashkortostan, Russia. The population was 417 as of 2010. There are 4 streets.

== Geography ==
Kazanka is located 46 km northeast of Baymak (the district's administrative centre) by road. Sibay is the nearest rural locality.
