= Ishey =

Ishey Ишей
- Selo
- Location within Bashkortostan Location within Russia
- Coordinates: 52°57′N 57°50′E
- Country: Russia
- Region: Bashkortostan
- District: Baymaksky District
- Time zone: UTC+5:00

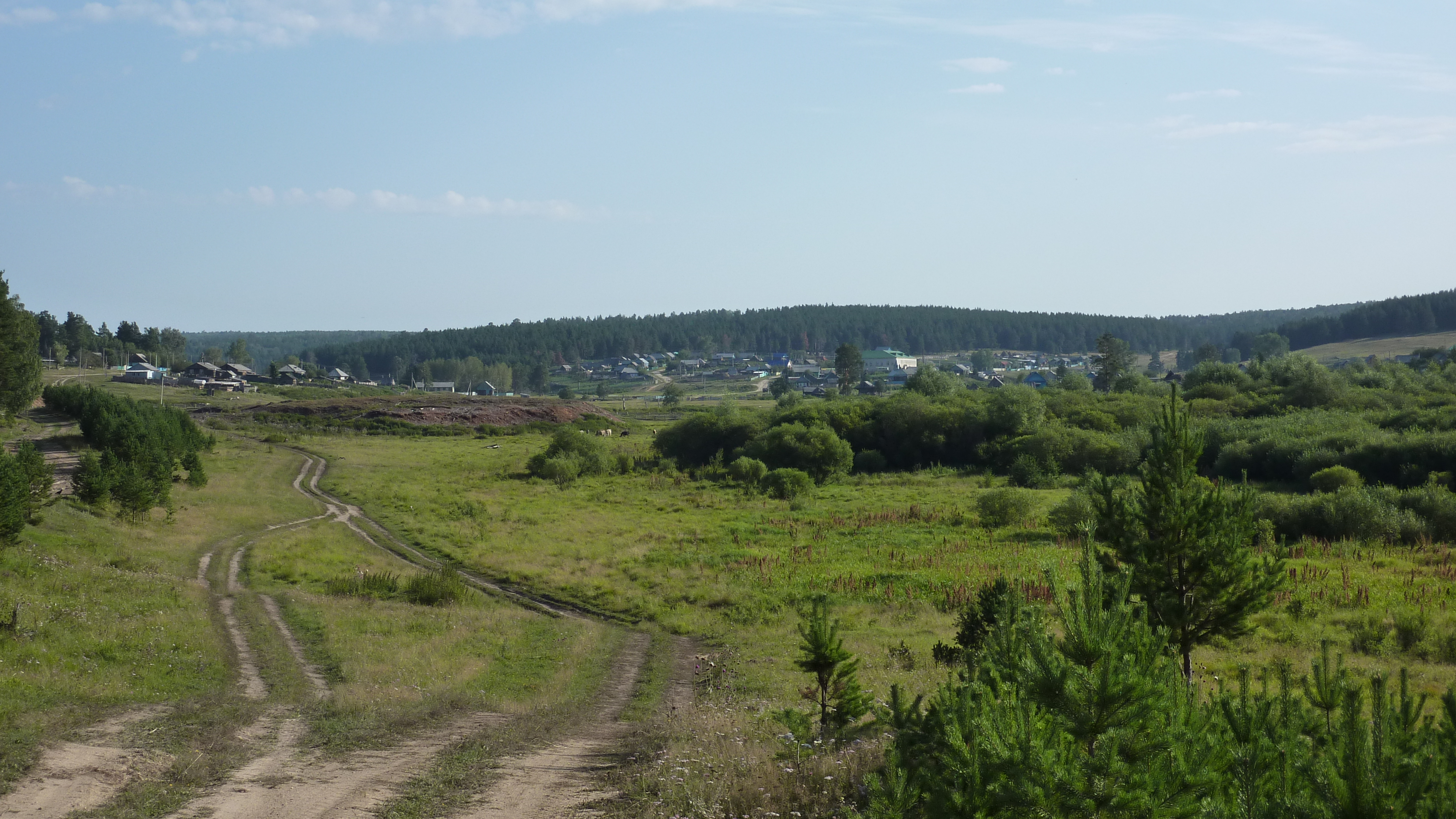
Entrance to Ishey - panoramio

Ishey (Russian: Ишей; Bashkir: Ишәй, İşäy) is a rural locality (a selo) in Temyasovsky Selsoviet, Baymaksky District, Bashkortostan, Russia. The population was 326 as of 2010. There are 10 streets.

== Geography ==
Ishey is located 79 km northwest of Baymak (the district's administrative centre) by road. Beterya is the nearest rural locality.
