= Ishberda =

Ishberda Ишберда
- Selo
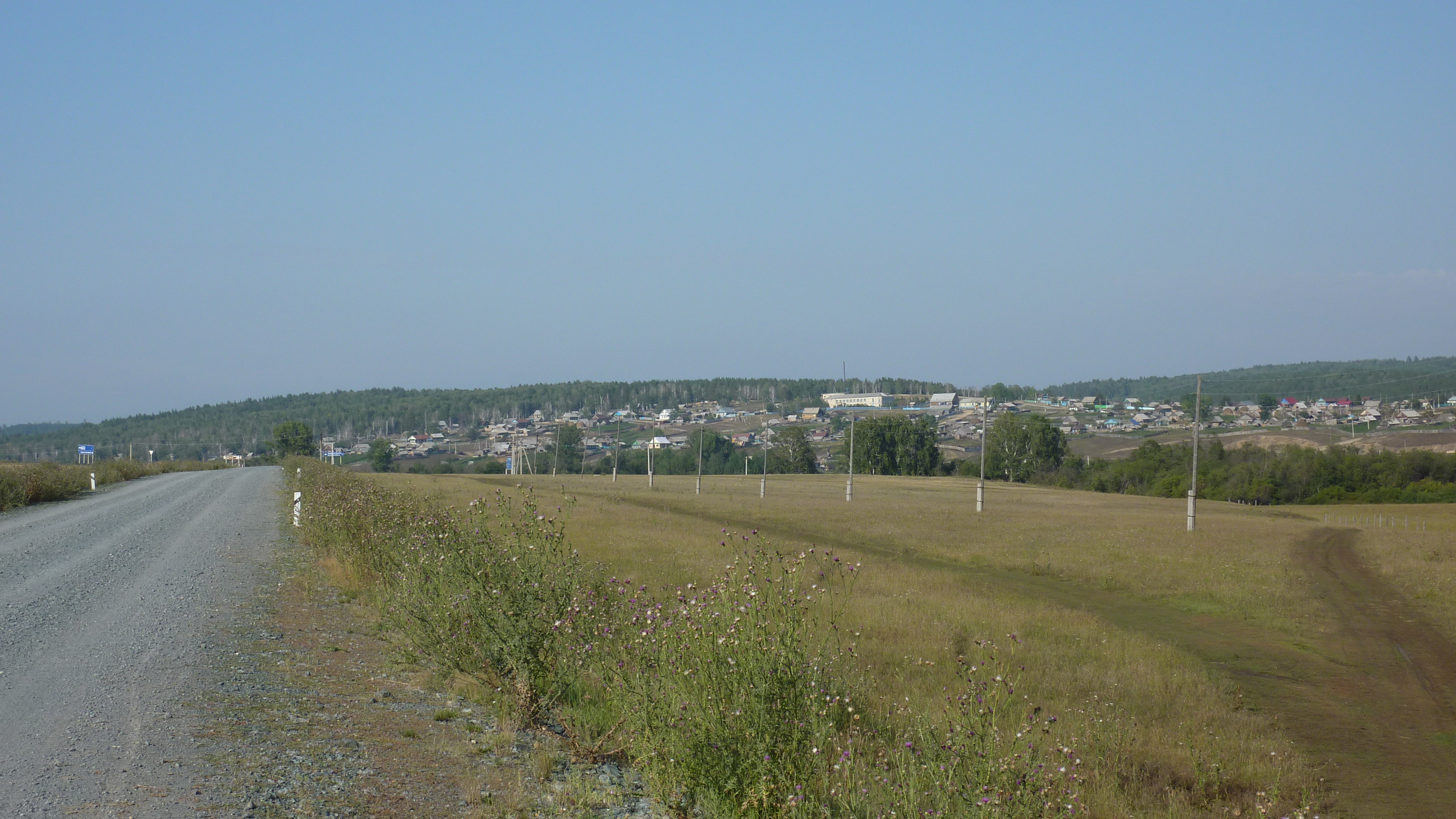

- Location within Bashkortostan Location within Russia
- Coordinates: 52°29′N 57°39′E
- Country: Russia
- Region: Bashkortostan
- District: Baymaksky District
- Time zone: UTC+5:00

Ishberda (Russian: Ишберда; Bashkir: Ишбирҙе, İşbirźe) is a rural locality (a selo) and the administrative centre of Ishberdinsky Selsoviet, Baymaksky District, Bashkortostan, Russia. The population was 638 as of 2010. There are 6 streets.

== Geography ==
Ishberda is located 73 km southwest of Baymak (the district's administrative centre) by road. Krepostnoy Zilair is the nearest rural locality.
