= Yarmukhametovo =

Yarmukhametovo Ярмухаметово
- Village
- Location within Bashkortostan Location within Russia
- Coordinates: 52°36′N 57°49′E
- Country: Russia
- Region: Bashkortostan
- District: Baymaksky District
- Time zone: UTC+5:00

Yarmukhametovo (Russian: Ярмухаметово; Bashkir: Йәрмөхәмәт, Yärmöxämät) is a rural locality (a village) in Yaratovsky Selsoviet, Baymaksky District, Bashkortostan, Russia. The population was 182 as of 2010. There are 4 streets.

== Geography ==
Yarmukhametovo is located 39 km west of Baymak (the district's administrative centre) by road. Gadelbayevo is the nearest rural locality.
