= Yanzigitovo =

Yanzigitovo Янзигитово
- Village
- Location within Bashkortostan Location within Russia
- Coordinates: 52°37′N 58°35′E
- Country: Russia
- Region: Bashkortostan
- District: Baymaksky District
- Time zone: UTC+5:00

Yanzigitovo (Russian: Янзигитово; Bashkir: Йәнйегет, Yänyeget) is a rural locality (a village) in Tatlybayevsky Selsoviet, Baymaksky District, Bashkortostan, Russia. The population was 362 as of 2010. There are 7 streets.

== Geography ==
Yanzigitovo is located 30 km east of Baymak (the district's administrative centre) by road. Khasanovo is the nearest rural locality.
