= Tubinsky =

Tubinsky Тубинский
- Selo
- Location within Bashkortostan Location within Russia
- Coordinates: 52°53′N 58°13′E
- Country: Russia
- Region: Bashkortostan
- District: Baymaksky District
- Time zone: UTC+5:00

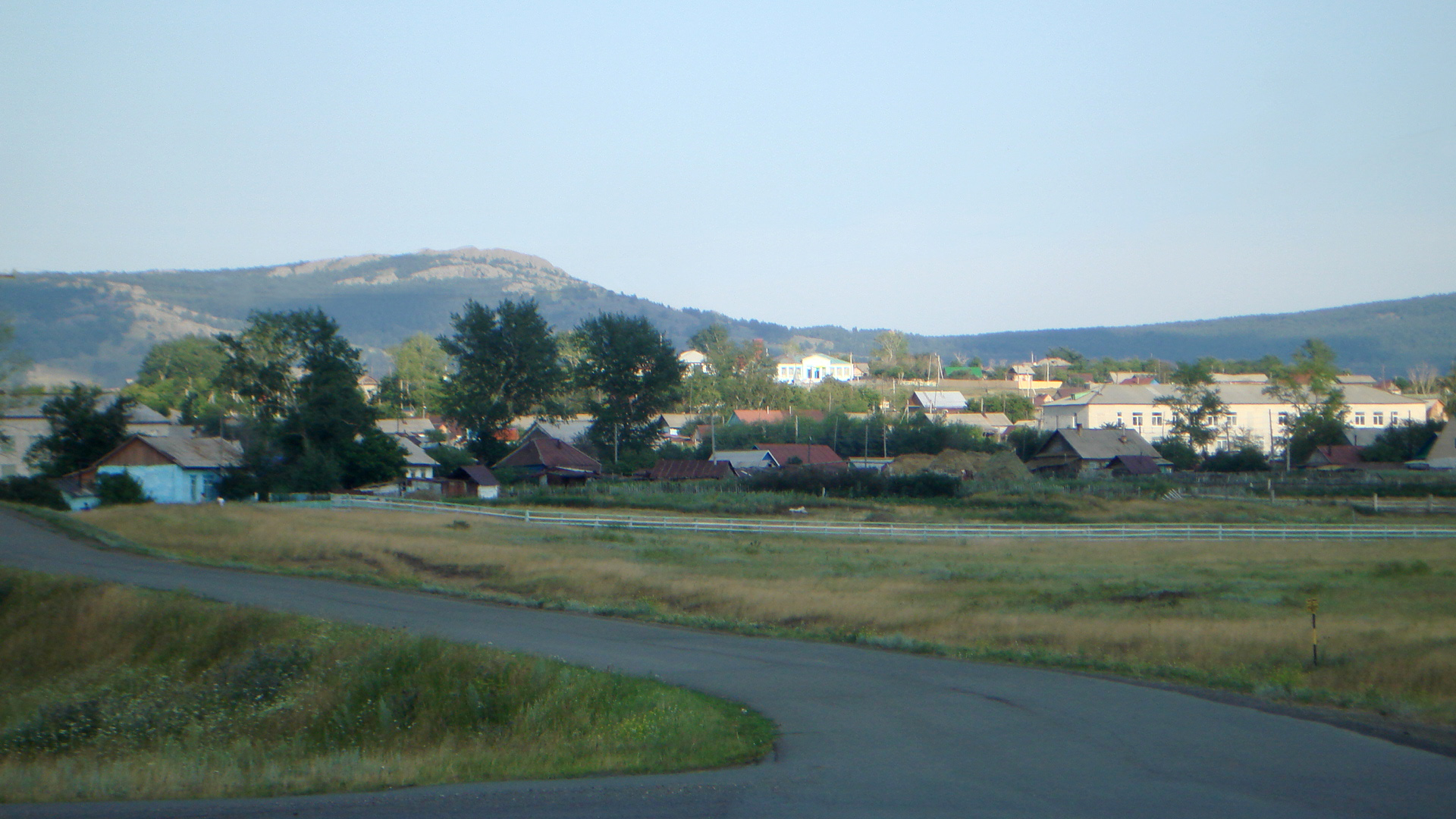
Village Tubinsky, Bashkortostan, Russia

Tubinsky (Russian: Тубинский; Bashkir: Түбә, Tübä) is a rural locality (a selo) and the administrative centre of Tubinsky Selsoviet, Baymaksky District, Bashkortostan, Russia. The population was 1,228 as of 2010. There are 15 streets.

== Geography ==
Tubinsky is located 43 km north of Baymak (the district's administrative centre) by road. Mullakayevo is the nearest rural locality.
