= Meryasovo =

Meryasovo Мерясово
- Selo
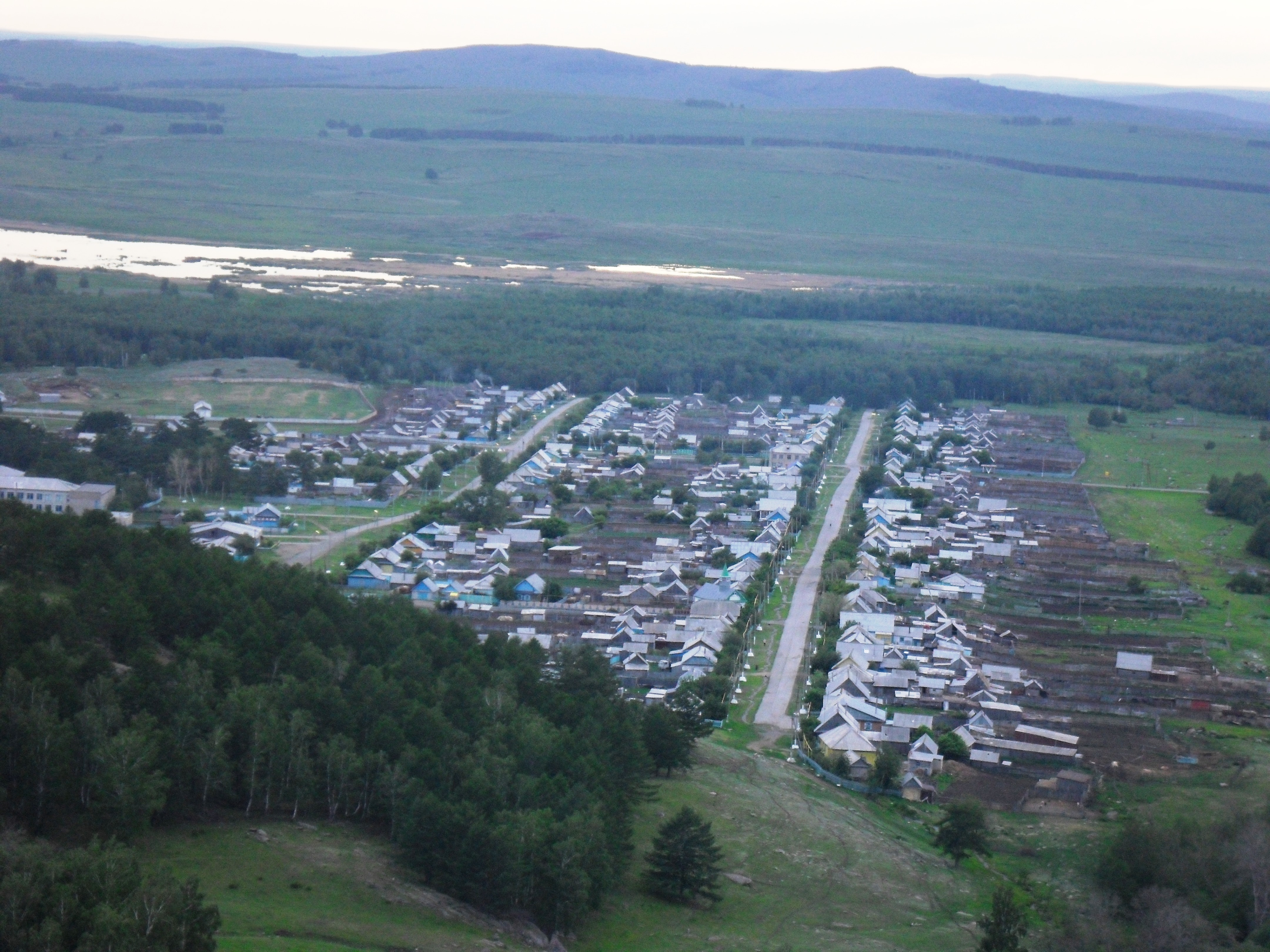
- View of the village of Meryasovo from Mount Irandyk

- Location within Bashkortostan Location within Russia
- Coordinates: 52°40′N 58°18′E
- Country: Russia
- Region: Bashkortostan
- District: Baymaksky District
- Time zone: UTC+5:00

Meryasovo (Russian: Мерясово; Bashkir: Мерәҫ, Meräś) is a rural locality (a selo) and the administrative centre of Meryasovsky Selsoviet, Baymaksky District, Bashkortostan, Russia. The population was 429 as of 2010. There are 9 streets.

== Geography ==
Meryasovo is located 16 km north of Baymak (the district's administrative centre) by road. Kuyantayevo is the nearest rural locality.
