= Shulka =

Shulka Шулька
- Khutor
- Location within Bashkortostan Location within Russia
- Coordinates: 52°41′N 57°42′E
- Country: Russia
- Region: Bashkortostan
- District: Baymaksky District
- Time zone: UTC+5:00

Shulka (Russian: Шулька; Bashkir: Шүлкә, Şülkä) is a rural locality (a khutor) in Itkulovsky 1st Selsoviet, Baymaksky District, Bashkortostan, Russia. The population was 181 as of 2010. There are 3 streets.

== Geography ==
Shulka is located 49 km northwest of Baymak (the district's administrative centre) by road. Nadezhdinsky is the nearest rural locality.
