= 2nd Itkulovo =

2nd Itkulovo 2-е Иткулово 2-се Этҡол
- Selo
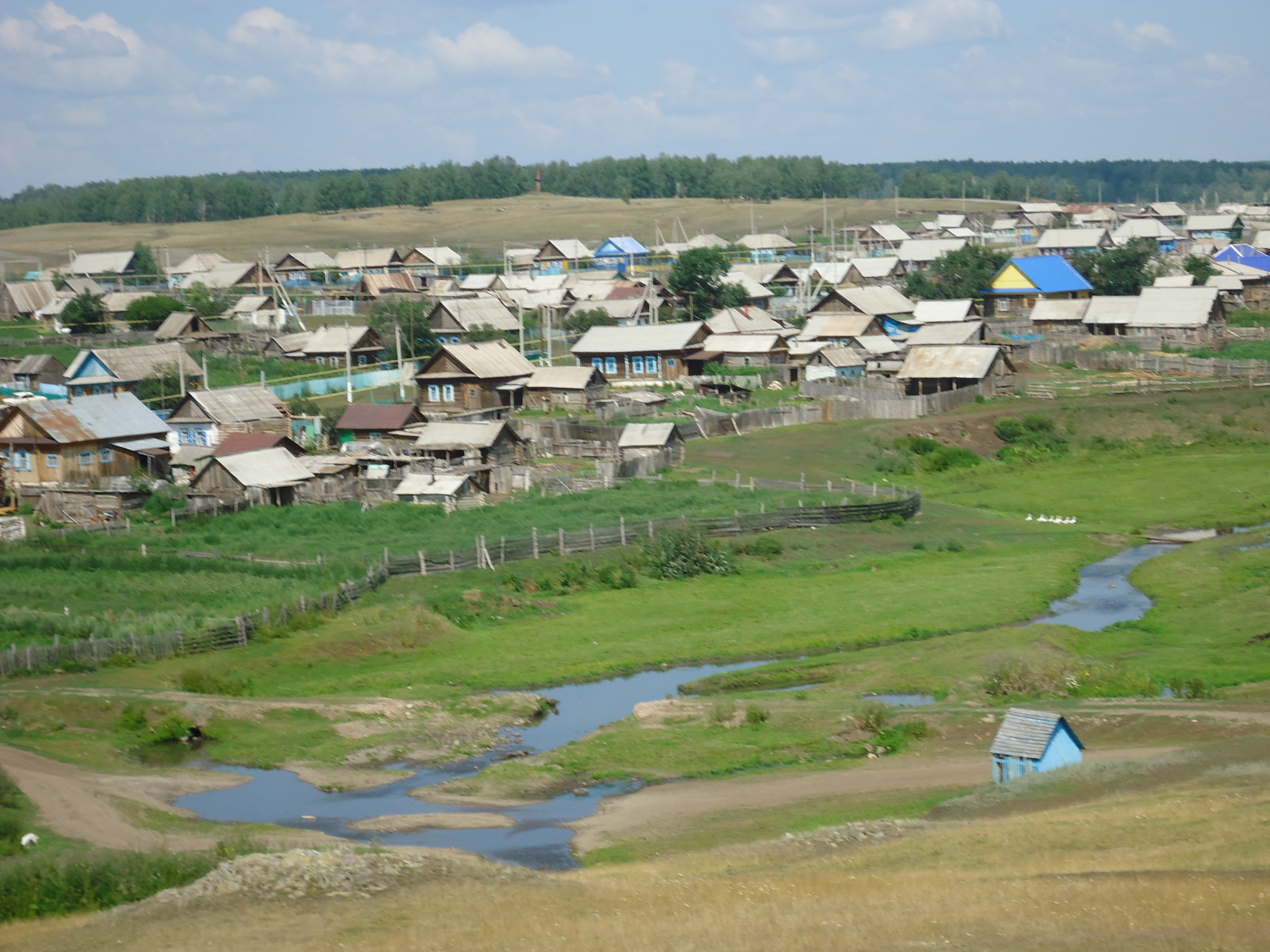

- Location within Bashkortostan Location within Russia
- Coordinates: 52.825278°N 57.976111°E
- Country: Russia
- Region: Bashkortostan
- District: Baymaksky District
- Time zone: UTC+05:00

2nd Itkulovo (Russian: 2-е Иткулово; Bashkir: 2-се Этҡол, 2-se Etqol) is a rural locality (a selo) in Nigamatovsky Selsoviet, Baymaksky District, Russia. The population was 853 as of 2010.

== Geography ==
2nd Itkulovo is located 37 km northwest of Baymak (the district's administrative centre) by road. Nigamatovo is the nearest rural locality.

== Ethnicity ==
The village is inhabited by mostly Bashkirs.

== Streets ==
- Lenina
- Lesnaya
- Mira
- Revolutsionnaya
- S. Yulaeva
