= Komsomol, Baymaksky District, Republic of Bashkortostan =

Komsomol Комсомол
- Village
- Location within Bashkortostan Location within Russia
- Coordinates: 52°17′N 58°43′E
- Country: Russia
- Region: Bashkortostan
- District: Baymaksky District
- Time zone: UTC+5:00

Komsomol (Russian: Комсомол) is a rural locality (a village) in Zilairsky Selsoviet, Baymaksky District, Bashkortostan, Russia. The population was 222 as of 2010. There are 5 streets.

== Geography ==
Komsomol is located 64 km southeast of Baymak (the district's administrative centre) by road. Urgaza is the nearest rural locality.
