= Verkhneidrisovo =

Verkhneidrisovo Верхнеидрисово
- Village
- Location within Bashkortostan Location within Russia
- Coordinates: 52°56′N 58°04′E
- Country: Russia
- Region: Bashkortostan
- District: Baymaksky District
- Time zone: UTC+5:00

Verkhneidrisovo (Russian: Верхнеидрисово; Bashkir: Үрге Иҙрис, Ürge İźris) is a rural locality (a village) in Kulchurovsky Selsoviet, Baymaksky District, Bashkortostan, Russia. The population was 412 as of 2010. There are 3 streets.

== Geography ==
Verkhneidrisovo is located 57 km north of Baymak (the district's administrative centre) by road. Nizhneidrisovo is the nearest rural locality.
