= Baymurzino =

Baymurzino Баймурзино
- Village
- Location within Bashkortostan Location within Russia
- Coordinates: 53°10′N 58°10′E
- Country: Russia
- Region: Bashkortostan
- District: Baymaksky District
- Time zone: UTC+5:00

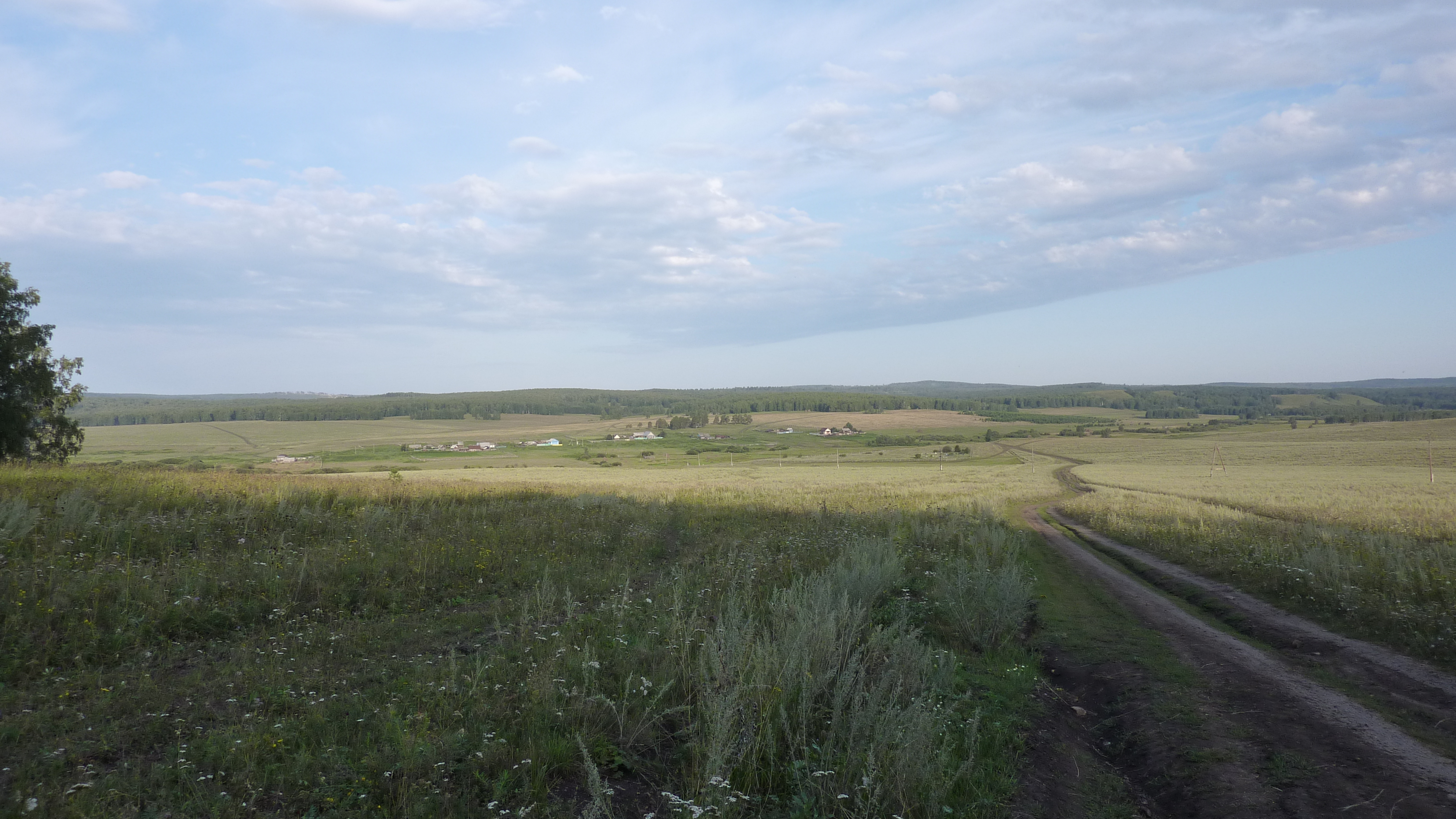
Baymurzino - panoramio

Baymurzino (Russian: Баймурзино; Bashkir: Баймырҙа, Baymırźa) is a rural locality (a village) in Bilyalovsky Selsoviet, Baymaksky District, Bashkortostan, Russia. The population was 20 as of 2010. There is 1 street.

== Geography ==
Baymurzino is located on the right bank of the Sakmara River, 77 km north of Baymak (the district's administrative centre) by road. Umetbayevo is the nearest rural locality.
