= Mullakayevo, Baymaksky District, Republic of Bashkortostan =

Mullakayevo Муллакаево
- Village
- Location within Bashkortostan Location within Russia
- Coordinates: 52°53′N 58°06′E
- Country: Russia
- Region: Bashkortostan
- District: Baymaksky District
- Time zone: UTC+5:00

Mullakayevo (Russian: Муллакаево; Bashkir: Муллаҡай, Mullaqay) is a rural locality (a village) in Kulchurovsky Selsoviet, Baymaksky District, Bashkortostan, Russia. The population was 475 as of 2010. There are 4 streets.

== Geography ==
Mullakayevo is located 60 km north of Baymak (the district's administrative centre) by road. Kulchurovo is the nearest rural locality.
