= Saygafar =

Saygafar Сайгафар
- Village
- Location within Bashkortostan Location within Russia
- Coordinates: 52°30′N 58°00′E
- Country: Russia
- Region: Bashkortostan
- District: Baymaksky District

Population (2010)
  - Total: 630
- Time zone: UTC+5:00

Saygafar (Russian: Сайгафар; Bashkir: Сәйғәфәр, Säyğäfär) is a rural locality (a village) in Akmurunsky Selsoviet, Baymaksky District, Bashkortostan, Russia. The population was 630 as of 2010. There are 10 streets.

== Geography ==
Saygafar is located 29 km southwest of Baymak (the district's administrative centre) by road. Yumashevo is the nearest rural locality.
