= Isyanbetovo =

Isyanbetovo Исянбетово
- Village
- Location within Bashkortostan Location within Russia
- Coordinates: 52°55′N 58°22′E
- Country: Russia
- Region: Bashkortostan
- District: Baymaksky District
- Time zone: UTC+5:00

Isyanbetovo (Russian: Исянбетово; Bashkir: Иҫәнбәт, İśänbät) is a rural locality (a village) in Kuseyevsky Selsoviet, Baymaksky District, Bashkortostan, Russia. The population was 204 as of 2010. There are 2 streets.

== Geography ==
Isyanbetovo is located 69 km north of Baymak (the district's administrative centre) by road. Bolshebasayevo is the nearest rural locality.
