= Umetbayevo =

Umetbayevo Уметбаево
- Village
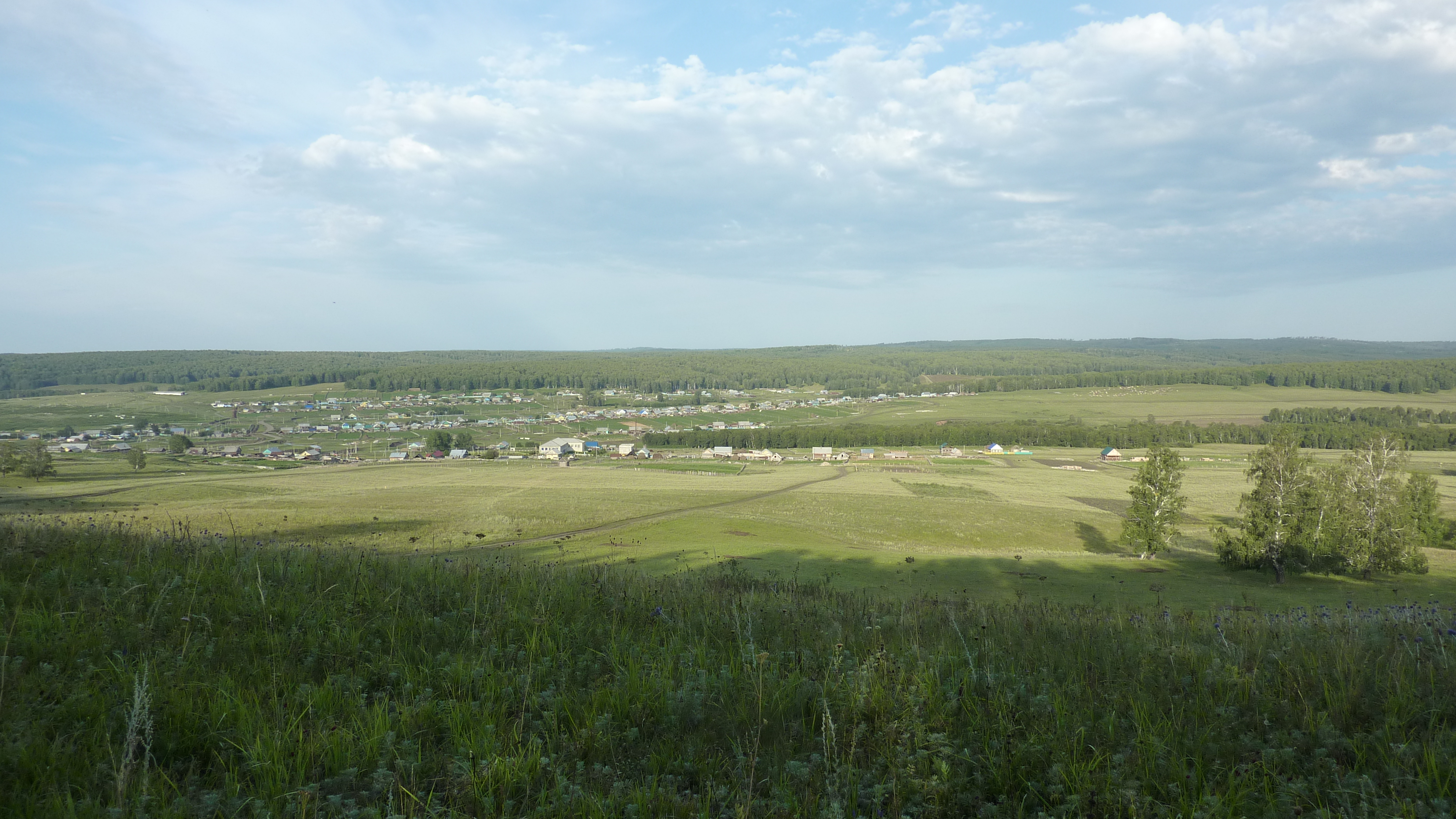

- Location within Bashkortostan Location within Russia
- Coordinates: 53°07′N 58°11′E
- Country: Russia
- Region: Bashkortostan
- District: Baymaksky District
- Time zone: UTC+5:00

Umetbayevo (Russian: Уметбаево; Bashkir: Өмөтбай, Ömötbay) is a rural locality (a village) in Bilyalovsky Selsoviet, Baymaksky District, Bashkortostan, Russia. The population was 535 as of 2010. There are 5 streets.

== Geography ==
Umetbayevo is located 73 km north of Baymak (the district's administrative centre) by road. Baymurzino is the nearest rural locality.
