= Nizhnetavlykayevo =

Nizhnetavlykayevo Нижнетавлыкаево
- Village
- Location within Bashkortostan Location within Russia
- Coordinates: 52°41′N 58°04′E
- Country: Russia
- Region: Bashkortostan
- District: Baymaksky District
- Time zone: UTC+5:00

Nizhnetavlykayevo (Russian: Нижнетавлыкаево; Bashkir: Түбәнге Таулыҡай, Tübänge Tawlıqay) is a rural locality (a village) in Tavlykayevsky Selsoviet, Baymaksky District, Bashkortostan, Russia. The population was 232 as of 2010. There are 2 streets.

== Geography ==
Nizhnetavlykayevo is located 25 km northwest of Baymak (the district's administrative centre) by road. Verkhnetavlykayevo is the nearest rural locality.
