= Buranbayevo =

Buranbayevo Буранбаево
- Village
- Location within Bashkortostan Location within Russia
- Coordinates: 52°38′N 57°59′E
- Country: Russia
- Region: Bashkortostan
- District: Baymaksky District
- Time zone: UTC+5:00

Buranbayevo (Russian: Буранбаево; Bashkir: Буранбай, Buranbay) is a rural locality (a village) in Tavlykayevsky Selsoviet, Baymaksky District, Bashkortostan, Russia. The population was 417 as of 2010. There are 5 streets.

== Geography ==
Buranbayevo is located 30 km northwest of Baymak (the district's administrative centre) by road. Chingizovo is the nearest rural locality.
