= Bakhtigareyevo, Baymaksky District, Republic of Bashkortostan =

Bakhtigareyevo Бахтигареево
- Village
- Location within Bashkortostan Location within Russia
- Coordinates: 52°45′N 58°16′E
- Country: Russia
- Region: Bashkortostan
- District: Baymaksky District
- Time zone: UTC+5:00

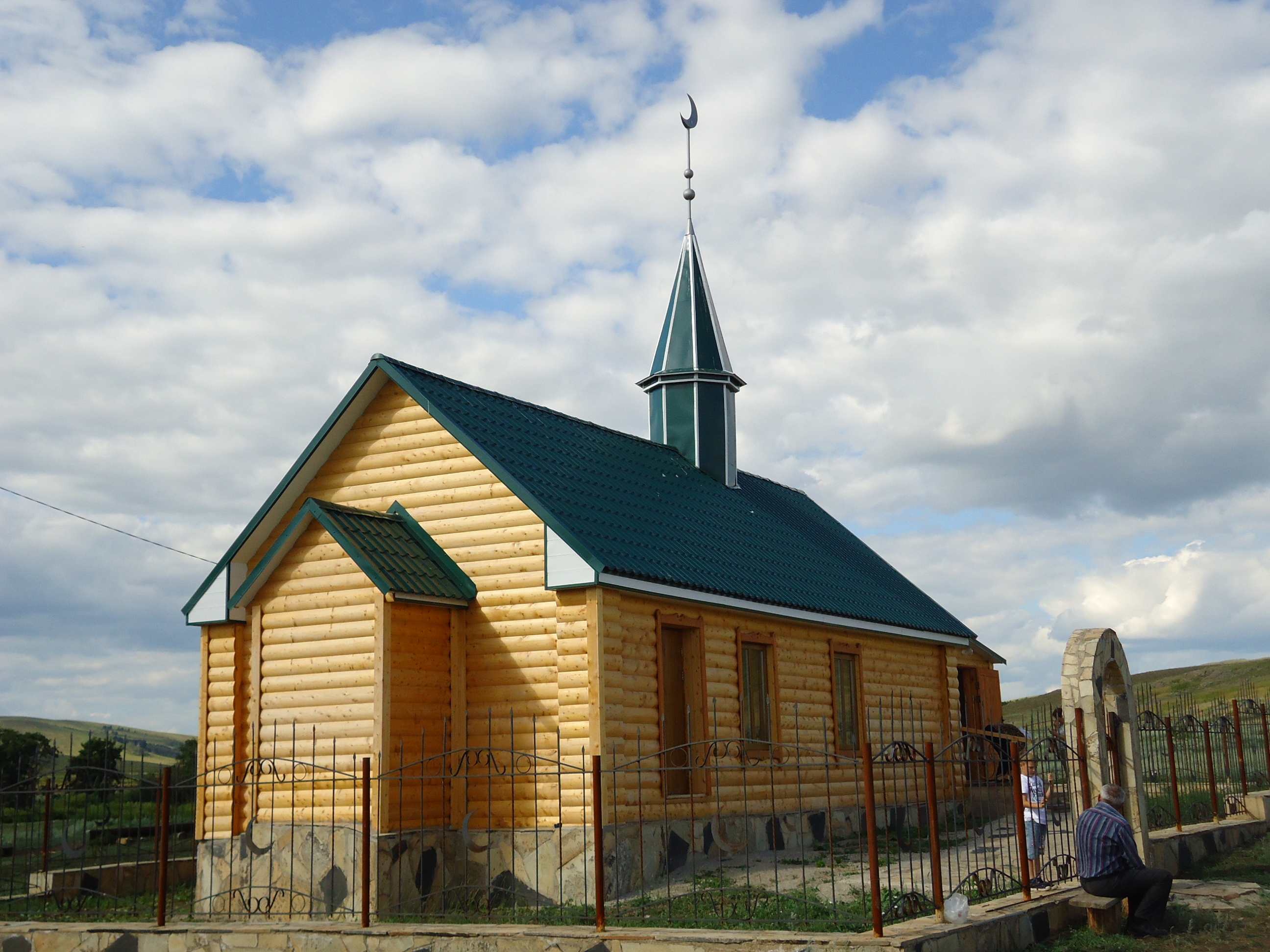
Mosque in Bakhtigareyevo

Bakhtigareyevo (Russian: Бахтигареево; Bashkir: Бәхтегәрәй, Bäxtegäräy) is a rural locality (a village) in Meryasovsky Selsoviet, Baymaksky District, Bashkortostan, Russia. The population was 84 as of 2010. There is 1 street.

== Geography ==
It is located 20 km from Baymak and 10 km from Meryasovo.
