= Kugidel =

Kugidel Кугидель
- Village
- Location within Bashkortostan Location within Russia
- Coordinates: 53°05′N 58°17′E
- Country: Russia
- Region: Bashkortostan
- District: Baymaksky District
- Time zone: UTC+5:00

Kugidel (Russian: Кугидель; Bashkir: Күгиҙел, Kügiźel) is a rural locality (a village) in Bilyalovsky Selsoviet, Baymaksky District, Bashkortostan, Russia. The population was 411 as of 2010. There are 5 streets.

== Geography ==
Kugidel is located 72 km north of Baymak (the district's administrative centre) by road. Semyonovo is the nearest rural locality.
