= Stary Sibay =

Stary Sibay Старый Сибай
- Selo
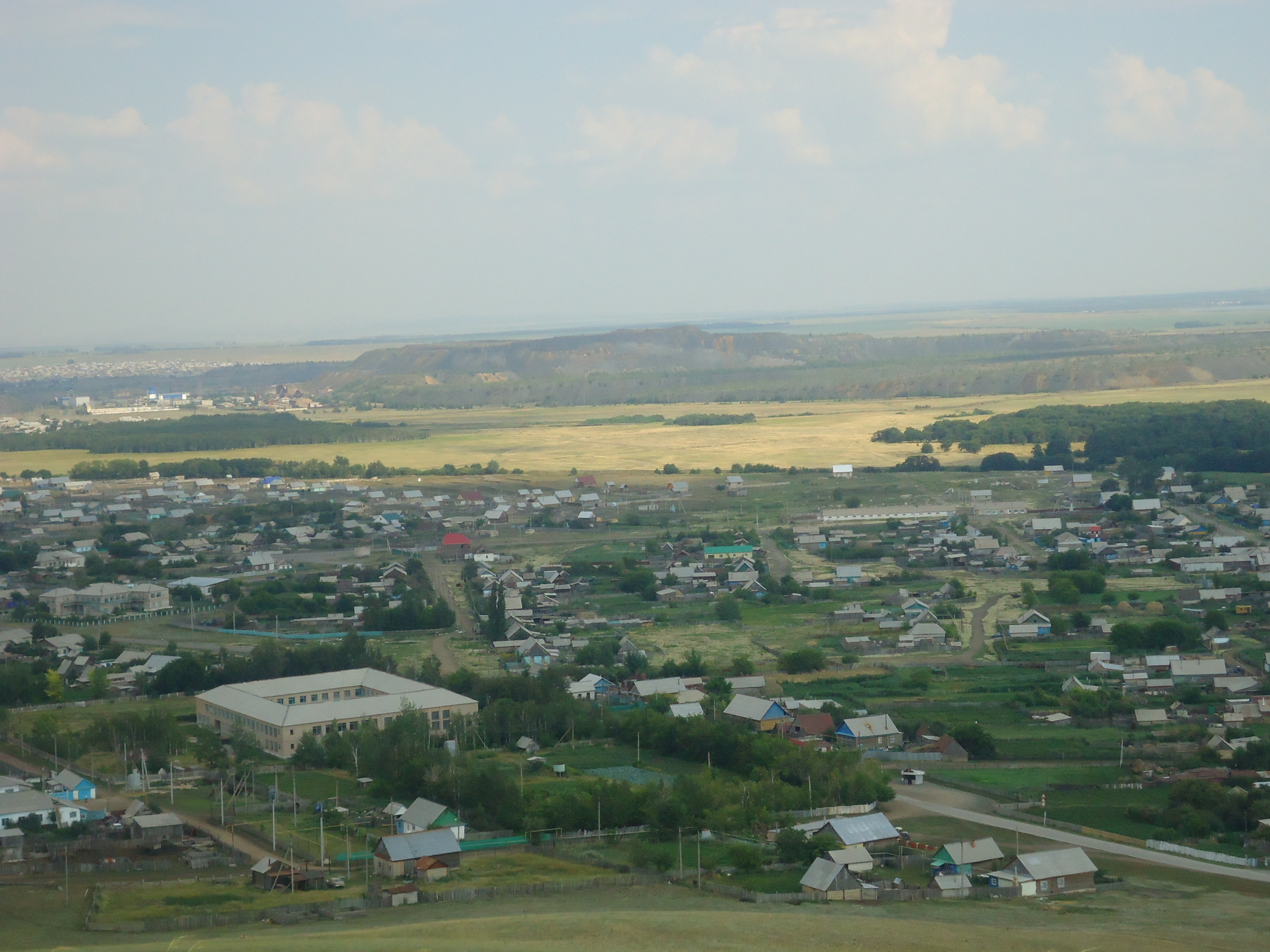

- Location within Bashkortostan Location within Russia
- Coordinates: 52°27′N 58°42′E
- Country: Russia
- Region: Bashkortostan
- District: Baymaksky District
- Time zone: UTC+5:00

Stary Sibay (Russian: Старый Сибай; Bashkir: Иҫке Сибай, romanized: Ecki Sibay) is a rural locality (a selo) and the administrative centre of Sibaysky Selsoviet, Baymaksky District, Bashkortostan, Russia. The population was 2,746 as of 2010. There are 48 streets.

== Geography ==
Stary Sibay is located 32 km northeast of Baymak (the district's administrative centre) by road. Zoloto is the nearest rural locality.
