= Bolshebasayevo =

Bolshebasayevo Большебасаево
- Village
- Location within Bashkortostan Location within Russia
- Coordinates: 52°54′N 58°25′E
- Country: Russia
- Region: Bashkortostan
- District: Baymaksky District
- Time zone: UTC+5:00

Bolshebasayevo (Russian: Большебасаево; Bashkir: Оло Басай, Olo Basay) is a rural locality (a village) in Kuseyevsky Selsoviet, Baymaksky District, Bashkortostan, Russia. The population was 267 as of 2010. There are 2 streets.

== Geography ==
Bolshebasayevo is located 65 km north of Baymak (the district's administrative centre) by road. Isyanbetovo is the nearest rural locality.
