= Kuyantayevo =

Kuyantayevo Куянтаево
- Selo
- Location within Bashkortostan Location within Russia
- Coordinates: 52°39′N 58°10′E
- Country: Russia
- Region: Bashkortostan
- District: Baymaksky District
- Time zone: UTC+5:00

Kuyantayevo (Russian: Куянтаево; Bashkir: Ҡуянтау, Quyantaw) is a rural locality (a selo) situated in Bekeshevsky Selsoviet, Baymaksky District, Bashkortostan, Russia. As of the 2010 census, the population was 933. and the locality contains 16 streets.

== Geography ==
Kuyantayevo is located 14 km northwest of Baymak (the district's administrative centre) by road. Karatal is the nearest rural locality.
