= Tatlybayevo =

Tatlybayevo Татлыбаево
- Selo
- Location within Bashkortostan Location within Russia
- Coordinates: 52°34′N 58°35′E
- Country: Russia
- Region: Bashkortostan
- District: Baymaksky District
- Time zone: UTC+5:00

Tatlybayevo (Russian: Татлыбаево; Bashkir: Татлыбай, Tatlıbay) is a rural locality (a selo) and the administrative centre of Tatlybayevsky Selsoviet, Baymaksky District, Bashkortostan, Russia. The population was 331 as of 2010. There are 5 streets.

== Geography ==
Tatlybayevo is located 35 km east of Baymak (the district's administrative centre) by road. Abdrakhmanovo is the nearest rural locality.
