= Baishevo, Baymaksky District, Republic of Bashkortostan =

Baishevo Баишево
- Village
- Location within Bashkortostan Location within Russia
- Coordinates: 52°28′N 58°31′E
- Country: Russia
- Region: Bashkortostan
- District: Baymaksky District
- Time zone: UTC+5:00

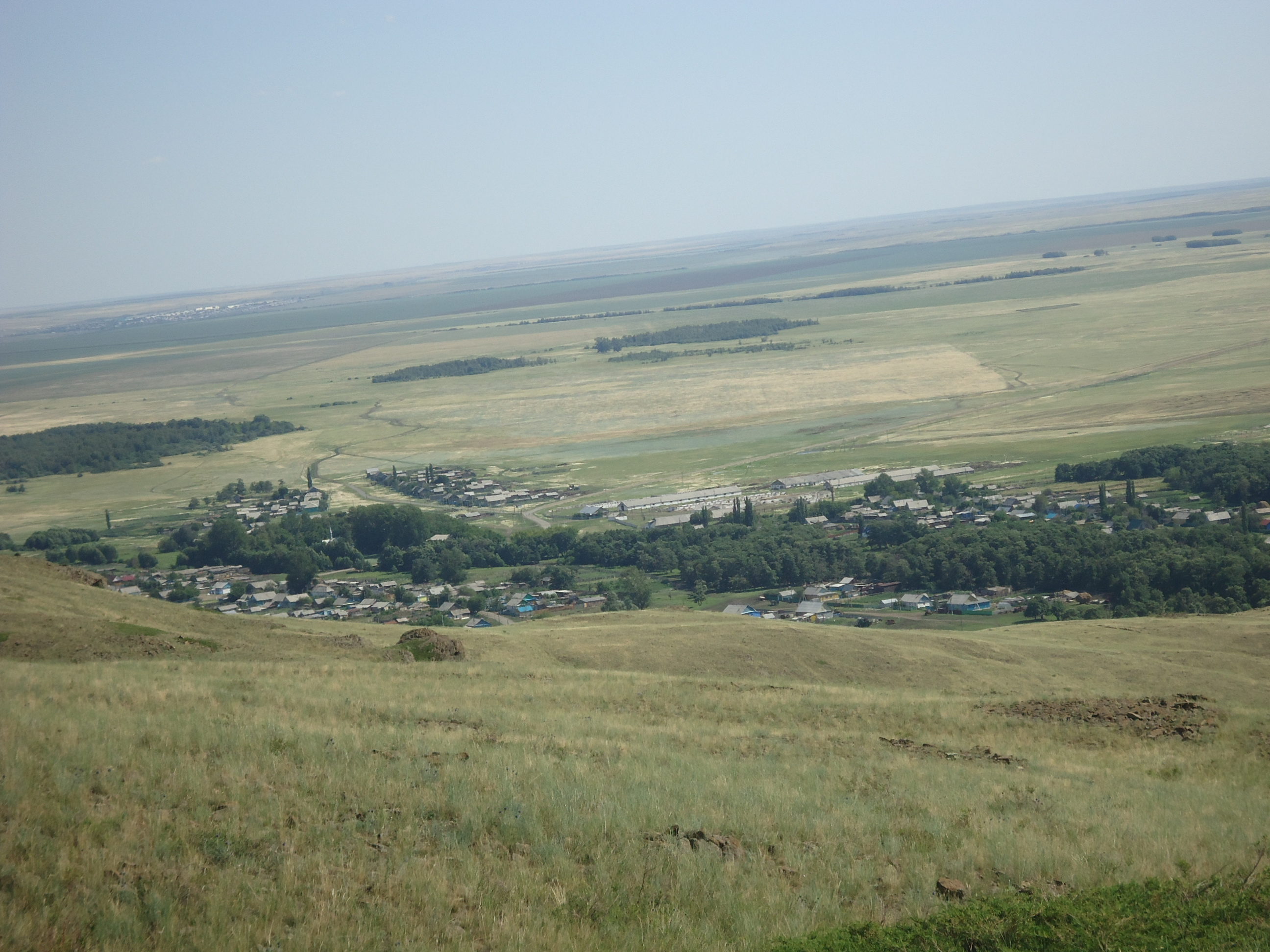
Bayish village (Baimak region)

Baishevo (Russian: Баишево; Bashkir: Байыш, Bayış) is a rural locality (a village) in Ishmukhametovsky Selsoviet, Baymaksky District, Bashkortostan, Russia. The population was 505 as of 2010. There are 5 streets.

== Geography ==
Baishevo is located 50 km southeast of Baymak (the district's administrative centre) by road. Karyshkino is the nearest rural locality.
