= Aminevo =

Aminevo Аминево
- Village
- Location within Bashkortostan Location within Russia
- Coordinates: 52°58′N 58°04′E
- Country: Russia
- Region: Bashkortostan
- District: Baymaksky District
- Time zone: UTC+5:00

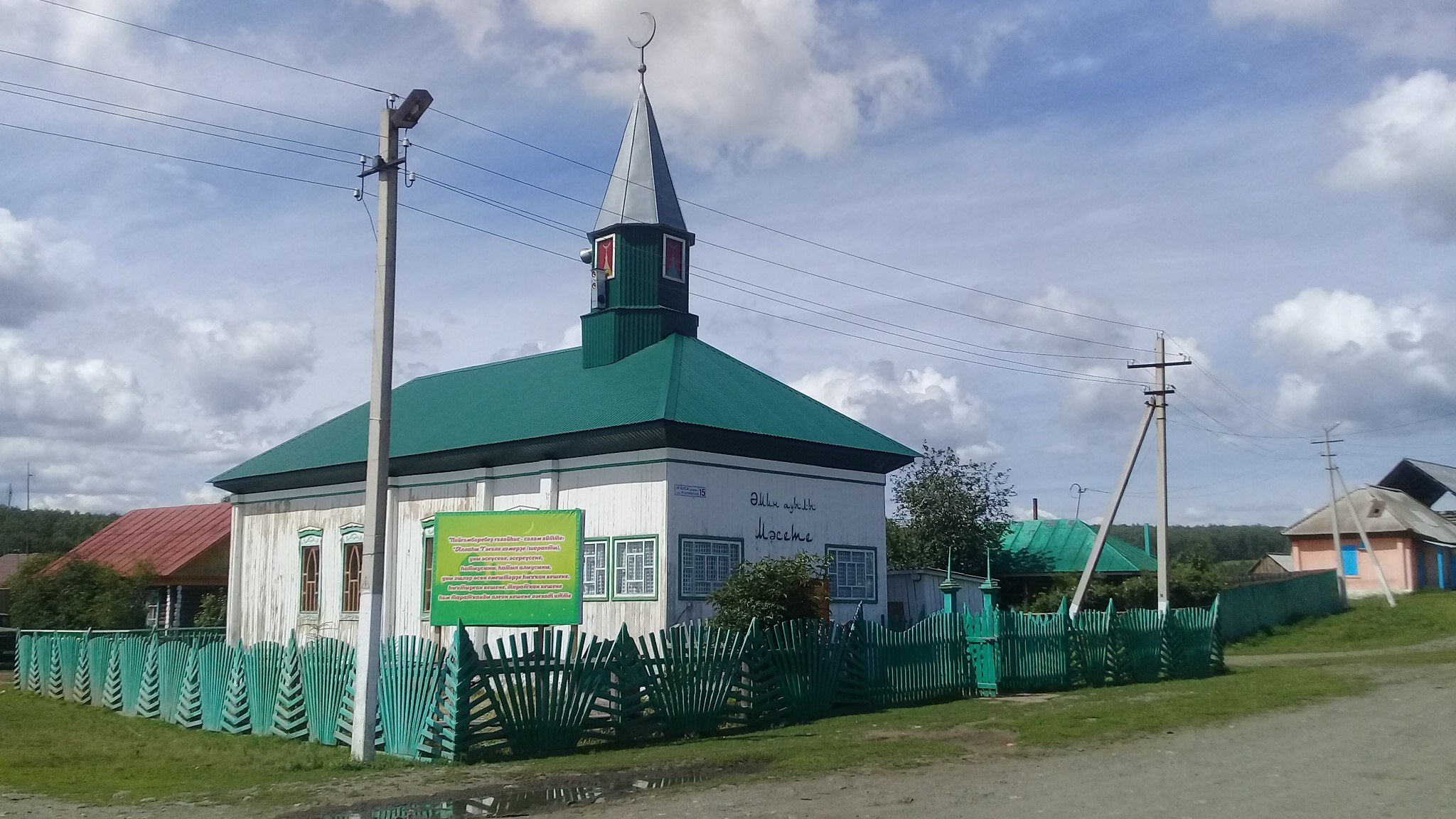
Mosque of Amin village (Baimak region)

Aminevo (Russian: Аминево; Bashkir: Әмин, Ämin) is a rural locality (a village) in Temyasovsky Selsoviet, Baymaksky District, Bashkortostan, Russia. The population was 277 as of 2010. There are 6 streets.

== Geography ==
Aminevo is located 58 km north of Baymak (the district's administrative centre) by road. Derevnya Kozhzavoda is the nearest rural locality.
