= Yangazino =

Yangazino Янгазино
- Village
- Location within Bashkortostan Location within Russia
- Coordinates: 52°21′N 58°29′E
- Country: Russia
- Region: Bashkortostan
- District: Baymaksky District
- Time zone: UTC+5:00

Yangazino (Russian: Янгазино; Bashkir: Яңғаҙы, Yañğaźı) is a rural locality (a village) in Ishmukhametovsky Selsoviet, Baymaksky District, Bashkortostan, Russia. The population was 130 as of 2010. There are 3 streets.

== Geography ==
Yangazino is located 43 km southeast of Baymak (the district's administrative centre) by road. Ishmukhametovo is the nearest rural locality.
