= Ural, Baymaksky District, Bashkortostan =

Ural Урал
- Village
- Location within Bashkortostan Location within Russia
- Coordinates: 52°16′N 58°54′E
- Country: Russia
- Region: Bashkortostan
- District: Baymaksky District
- Time zone: UTC+5:00

Ural (Russian: Урал) is a rural locality (a village) in Zilairsky Selsoviet, Baymaksky District, Bashkortostan, Russia. The population was 215 as of 2010. There are 5 streets.

== Geography ==
Ural is located 77 km southeast of Baymak (the district's administrative centre) by road. Verkhnyaya Kardailovka is the nearest rural locality.
