= Kulchurovo =

Kulchurovo Кульчурово
- Selo
- Location within Bashkortostan Location within Russia
- Coordinates: 52°55′N 58°04′E
- Country: Russia
- Region: Bashkortostan
- District: Baymaksky District
- Time zone: UTC+5:00

Kulchurovo (Russian: Кульчурово; Bashkir: Ҡолсора, Qolsora) is a rural locality (a selo) and the administrative centre of Kulchurovsky Selsoviet, Baymaksky District, Bashkortostan, Russia. The population was 429 as of 2010. There are 5 streets.

== Geography ==
Kulchurovo is located 57 km north of Baymak (the district's administrative centre) by road. Nizhneidrisovo is the nearest rural locality.
