= Beterya =

Beterya Бетеря
- Village
- Location within Bashkortostan Location within Russia
- Coordinates: 53°03′N 57°56′E
- Country: Russia
- Region: Bashkortostan
- District: Baymaksky District
- Time zone: UTC+5:00

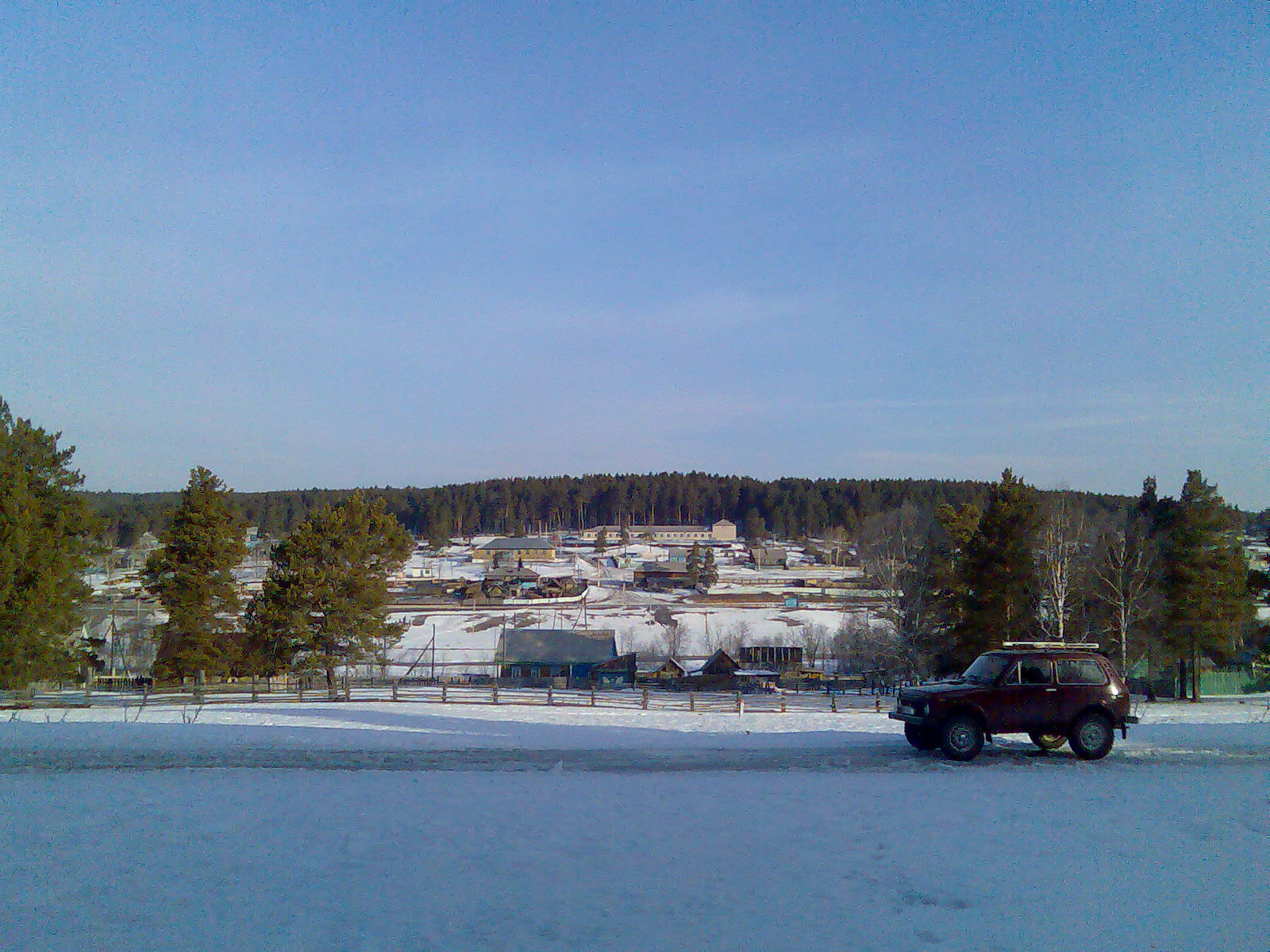

Beterya (Russian: Бетеря; Bashkir: Бетерә, Beterä) is a rural locality (a village) in Temyasovsky Selsoviet, Baymaksky District, Bashkortostan, Russia. The population was 323 as of 2010. There are 8 streets.

== Geography ==
Beterya is located 71 km north of Baymak (the district's administrative centre) by road. Saksay is the nearest rural locality.
