= Isyanovo =

Isyanovo Исяново
- Village
- Location within Bashkortostan Location within Russia
- Coordinates: 52°48′N 58°14′E
- Country: Russia
- Region: Bashkortostan
- District: Baymaksky District
- Time zone: UTC+5:00

Isyanovo (Russian: Исяново; Bashkir: Иҫән, İśän) is a rural locality (a village) in Nigamatovsky Selsoviet, Baymaksky District, Bashkortostan, Russia. The population was 176 as of 2010. There are 6 streets.

== Geography ==
Isyanovo is located 28 km north of Baymak (the district's administrative centre) by road. Bakhtigareyevo is the nearest rural locality.

== Population ==
According to the 2002 Russian Census, Bashkirs were the predominant ethnic group, accounting for 97% of the population.

== Landmarks ==
Lake Talkas is located nearby, as is the Talkas Sanatorium.
