= Algazino, Republic of Bashkortostan =

Algazino Алгазино
- Village
- Location within Bashkortostan Location within Russia
- Coordinates: 52°27′N 57°48′E
- Country: Russia
- Region: Bashkortostan
- District: Baymaksky District
- Time zone: UTC+5:00

Algazino (Russian: Алгазино; Bashkir: Алғазы, Alğazı) is a rural locality (a village) in Abdulkarimovsky Selsoviet, Baymaksky District, Bashkortostan, Russia. The population was 194 as of 2010. There are 2 streets.

== Geography ==
Algazino is located 51 km northeast of Baymak (the district's administrative centre) by road. Abdulkarimovo is the nearest rural locality.
