= Davletovo, Baymaksky District, Republic of Bashkortostan =

Davletovo Давлетово
- Village
- Location within Bashkortostan Location within Russia
- Coordinates: 52°44′N 58°35′E
- Country: Russia
- Region: Bashkortostan
- District: Baymaksky District
- Time zone: UTC+5:00

Davletovo (Russian: Давлетово; Bashkir: Дәүләт, Däwlät) is a rural locality (a village) in Sibaysky Selsoviet, Baymaksky District, Bashkortostan, Russia. The population was 25 as of 2010. There are 7 streets.

== Geography ==
Davletovo is located 44 km northeast of Baymak (the district's administrative centre) by road. Arkaim is the nearest rural locality.
