= Aktau, Republic of Bashkortostan =

Aktau Актау
- Village
- Location within Bashkortostan Location within Russia
- Coordinates: 52°34′N 58°10′E
- Country: Russia
- Region: Bashkortostan
- District: Baymaksky District
- Time zone: UTC+5:00

Aktau (Russian: Актау; Bashkir: Аҡтау, Aqtaw) is a rural locality (a village) in Akmurunsky Selsoviet, Baymaksky District, Bashkortostan, Russia. The population was 266 as of 2010. There are 5 streets.

== Geography ==
Aktau is located 15 km west of Baymak (the district's administrative centre) by road. Akmurun is the nearest rural locality.
