= 1st Turkmenevo =

1st Turkmenevo 1-е Туркменево 1-се Төрөкмән
- Selo
- Location within Bashkortostan Location within Russia
- Coordinates: 52.865556°N 58.525°E
- Country: Russia
- Region: Bashkortostan
- District: Baymaksky District
- Time zone: UTC+05:00

1st Turkmenevo (Russian: 1-е Туркменево; Bashkir: 1-се Төрөкмән, 1-se Törökmän) is a rural locality (a selo) and the administrative centre of Mukasovsky Selsoviet, Baymaksky District, Russia. The population was 1,043 as of 2010.

== Geography ==
1st Turkmenevo is located 59 km northeast of Baymak (the district's administrative centre) by road. Akhmerovo is the nearest rural locality.

== Ethnicity ==
The village is populated by Bashkirs.

== Streets ==
- Batyra Valida
- Buskun
- G. Suleimanova
- Gornaya
- Mira
- Molodezhnaya
- Peshiy Mahmut
- Salavata Yulaeva
- Taftizana Minigulova
- Tugazhman
- Tuyalyas
- Shaigita Hudaiberdina
- Shaizady Babicha
- Shkolnaya
