= Kuseyevo =

Kuseyevo Кусеево
- Selo
- Location within Bashkortostan Location within Russia
- Coordinates: 52°59′N 58°25′E
- Country: Russia
- Region: Bashkortostan
- District: Baymaksky District
- Time zone: UTC+5:00

Kuseyevo (Russian: Кусеево; Bashkir: Күсей, Küsey) is a rural locality (a selo) and the administrative centre of Kuseyevsky Selsoviet, Baymaksky District, Bashkortostan, Russia. The population was 450 as of 2010. There are 10 streets.

== Geography ==
Kuseyevo is located 75 km north of Baymak (the district's administrative centre) by road. Khalilovo is the nearest rural locality.
