= 2nd Turkmenevo =

2nd Turkmenevo 2-е Туркменево 2-се Төрөкмән 2-se Törökmän
- Village
- Location within Bashkortostan Location within Russia
- Coordinates: 52.854444°N 58.491389°E
- Country: Russia
- Region: Bashkortostan
- District: Baymaksky District
- Time zone: UTC+05:00

2nd Turkmenevo (Russian: 2-е Туркменево; Bashkir: 2-се Төрөкмән, 2-se Törökmän) is a rural locality (a village) in Mukasovsky Selsoviet, Baymaksky District, Russia. The population was 156 as of 2010.

== Geography ==
2nd Turkmenevo is located 60 km northeast of Baymak (the district's administrative centre) by road. 1st Turkmenevo is the nearest rural locality.

== Streets ==
- Muradym
- Tuyalyas
