= Yumashevo =

Yumashevo Юмашево
- Selo
- Location within Bashkortostan Location within Russia
- Coordinates: 52°30′N 57°56′E
- Country: Russia
- Region: Bashkortostan
- District: Baymaksky District

Population (2010)
  - Total: 1,006
- Time zone: UTC+5:00

Yumashevo (Russian: Юмашево) is a rural locality (a selo) in and the administrative centre of Yumashevsky Selsoviet, Baymaksky District, Bashkortostan, Russia. The population was 1,006 as of 2010. There are 16 streets.

== Geography ==
Yumashevo is located 33 km west of Baymak (the district's administrative centre) by road. Saygafar is the nearest rural locality.
