= Sibaysky mine =

Mine in Russia

- Location within Russia
- Location: Bashkortostan, Russia; 52°41′N 58°38′E
- Products: Copper

The Sibaysky mine is a large copper mine located in the south Russia in Baymaksky District, Bashkortostan. Sibaysky represents one of the largest copper reserves in Russia and in the world, having estimated reserves of 1.48 billion tonnes of ore grading 0.91% copper.
