= Lake Talkas =

Lake in Bashkiria, Russia

Talkas
- Талкас (Russian)
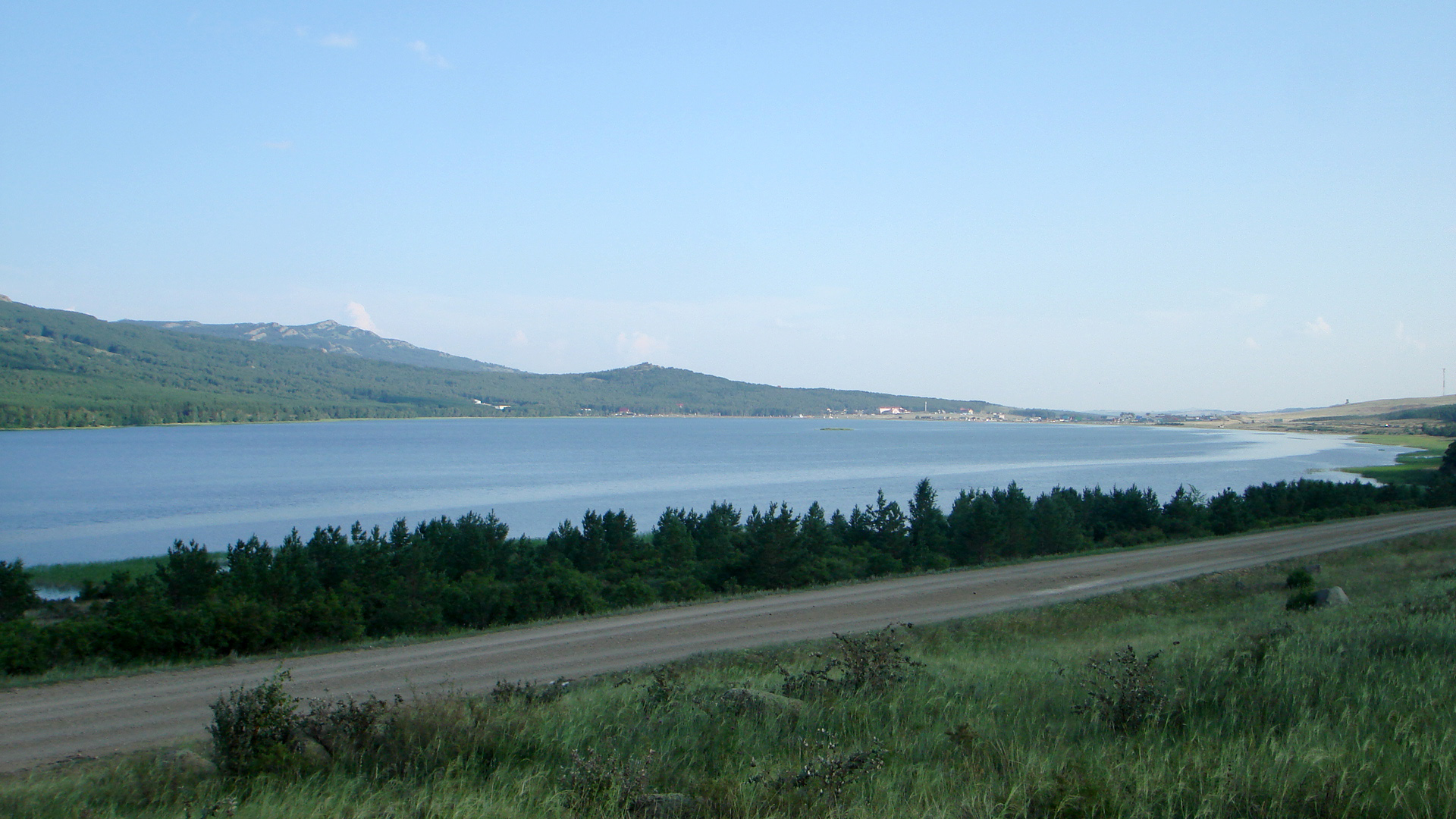

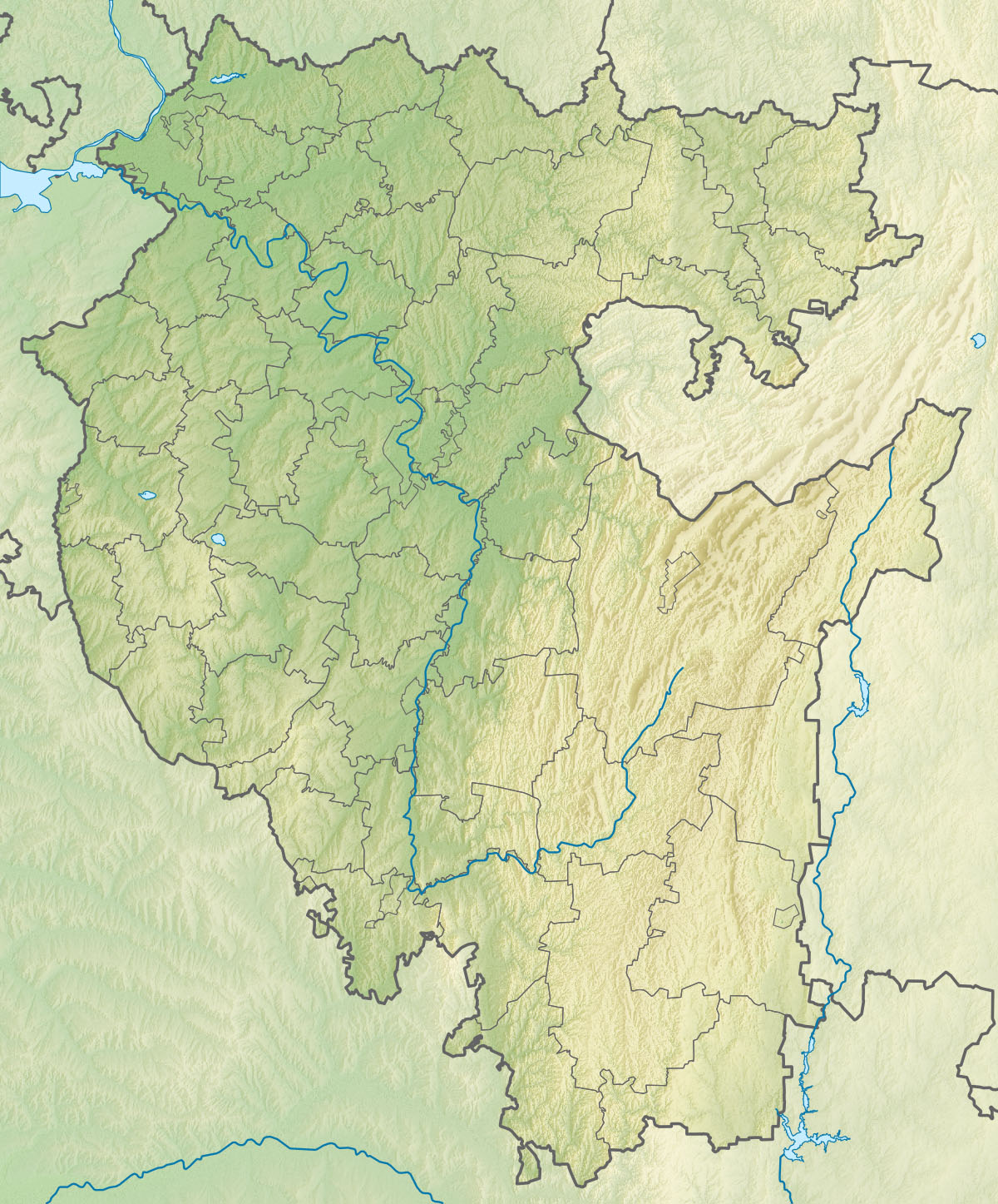
- Location within Bashkortostan
- Location: Bashkortostan, Russia
- Coordinates: 52°50′10″N 58°15′10″E
- Type: Tectonic
- Primary outflows: Shugur River
- Basin countries: Russia
- Max. length: 3.9 km (2.4 mi)
- Max. width: 0.99 km (0.62 mi)
- Surface area: 3.9 km^{2} (1.5 sq mi)
- Average depth: 4.5 m (15 ft)
- Max. depth: 12 m (39 ft)
- Water volume: 15.8 km^{3} (12,800,000 acre⋅ft)
- Surface elevation: 548.5 m (1,800 ft)
- Settlements: Isyanovo

Talkas (Russian: Талкас; Bashkir: Талҡаҫ, Talqaś) is a tectonic lake in Baymaksky District, Bashkortostan, Russia. It is located on the west slope of the mountain Irendyk, part of the Ural range.

The village of Isyanovo (170 inhabitants in 2010) is located on its shores. The lake also gives birth to the river of Shugur. In 1978 the lake was designated a natural monument. Because of its clean waters the lake is often called "The pearl of the Urals".
