= Tanalyk =

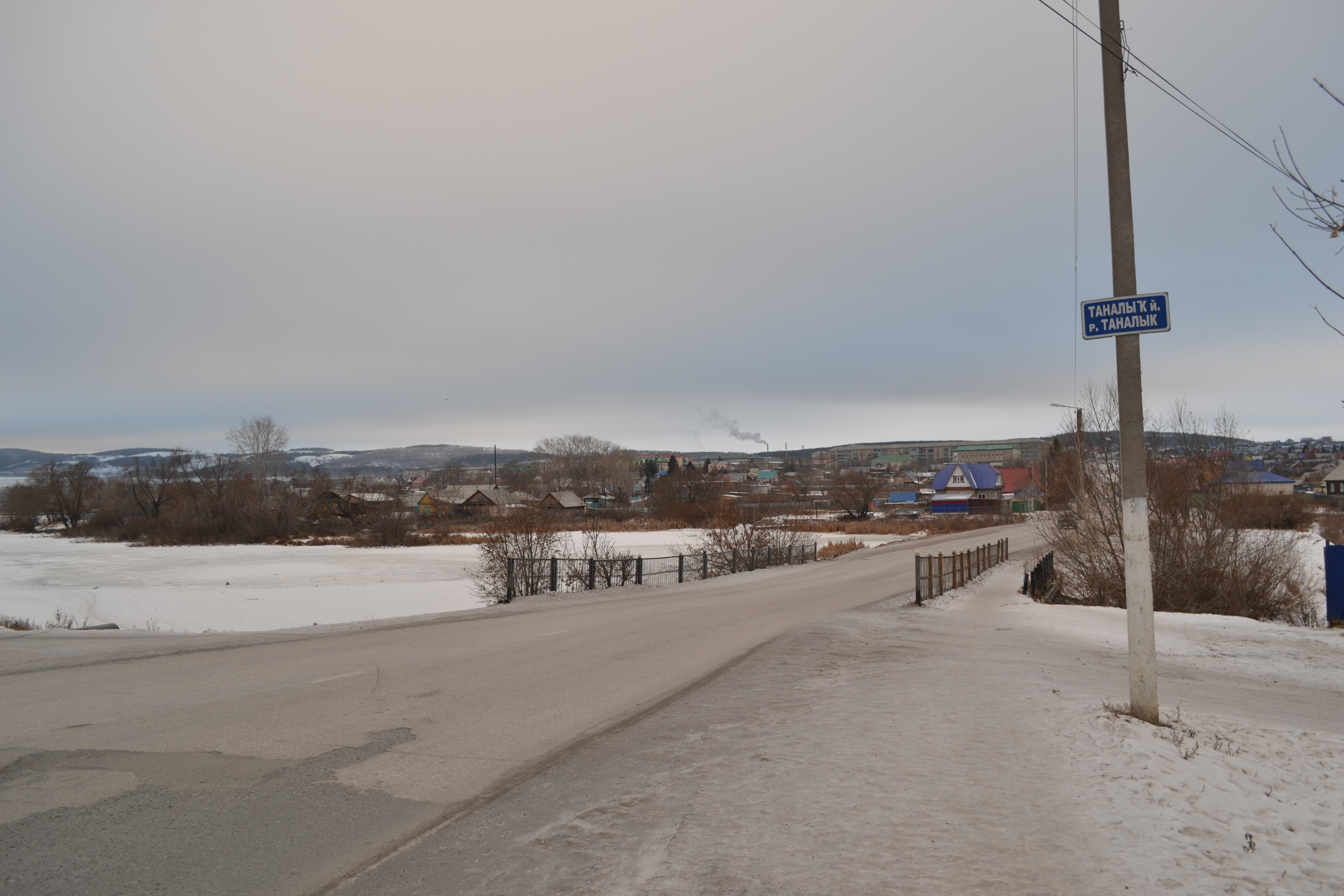

- Mouth location in Russia

Location
- Country: Russia

Physical characteristics
- Mouth: Ural
  - coordinates: 51.8694°N 58.6406°E
- Length: 225 km (140 mi)
- Basin size: 4,160 km^{2} (1,610 sq mi)

Basin features
- Progression: Ural→ Caspian Sea

The Tanalyk (Russian: Таналык; Bashkir: Таналыҡ, Tanalıq), is a river in Bashkortostan and Orenburg Oblast in Russia, a right tributary of the Ural. The river is 225 kilometres (140 mi) long, and the area of its drainage basin is 4,160 square kilometres (1,610 mi^{2}). The Tanalyk freezes up in the second half of October through November and remains icebound until April. The town of Baymak is along the Tanalyk.
