= Baymaksky District =

Baymaksky District Баймакский район (Russian)
- District

Other transcription(s)
  - Bashkir: Баймаҡ районы
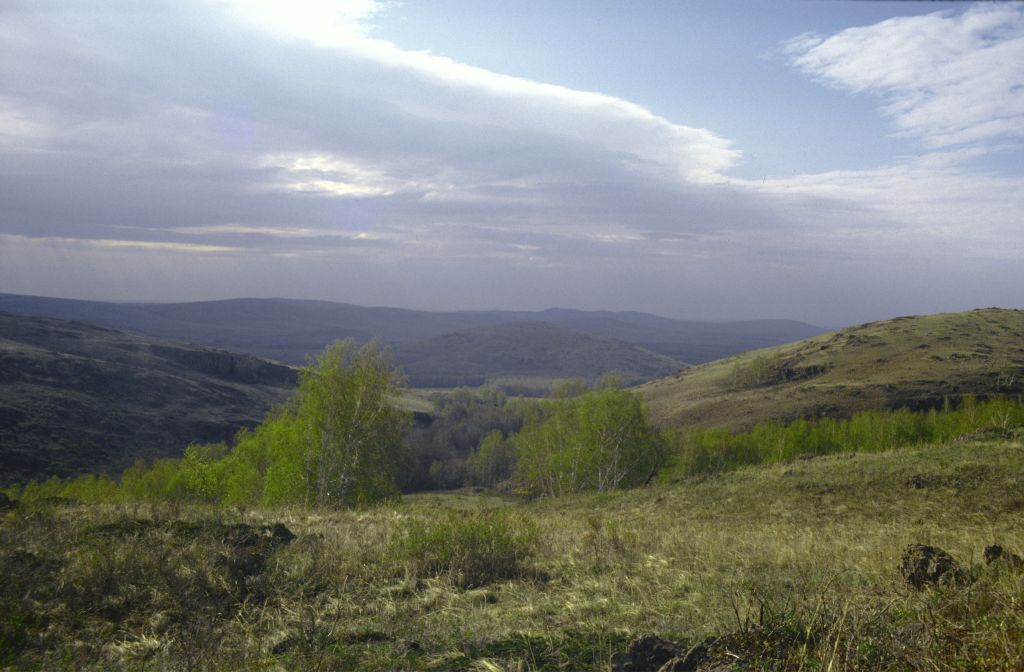
- Irendyk ridge, Baymaksky District

- Flag Coat of arms
- Location of Baymaksky District in the Republic of Bashkortostan
- Coordinates: 52°36′N 58°19′E
- Country: Russia
- Federal subject: Republic of Bashkortostan
- Established: August 20, 1930
- Administrative center: Baymak

Area
  - Total: 5,432 km^{2} (2,097 sq mi)

Population (2010 Census)
  - Total: 40,862
  - Estimate (2018): 56,390 (+38%)
  - Density: 7.522/km^{2} (19.48/sq mi)
  - Urban: 0%
  - Rural: 100%

Administrative structure
  - Administrative divisions: 22 Selsoviets
  - Inhabited localities: 91 rural localities

Municipal structure
  - Municipally incorporated as: Baymaksky Municipal District
  - Municipal divisions: 1 urban settlements, 22 rural settlements
- Time zone: UTC+5 (MSK+2)
- OKTMO ID: 80606000
- Website: http://baimak.ru

Population of Baymaksky District
- 2010 Census: 40,862
- 2002 Census: 44,214
- 1989 Census: 58,035
- 1979 Census: 56,236

Baymaksky District (Russian: Байма́кский райо́н; Bashkir: Баймаҡ районы, Baymaq rayonı) is an administrative and municipal district (raion), one of the fifty-four in the Republic of Bashkortostan, Russia. It is located in the southeast of the republic and borders with Abzelilovsky District in the north, Chelyabinsk Oblast and the territory of the town of republic significance of Sibay in the east, Khaybullinsky District in the south, and with Zilairsky District in the south and west. The area of the district is 5,432 square kilometers (2,097 sq mi). Its administrative center is the town of Baymak (which is not administratively a part of the district). As of the 2010 Census, the total population of the district was 40,862.

== Geography ==
Main bodies of water in the district include the Sakmara, Tanalyk, and Bolshaya Urtazymka Rivers (with minor tributaries) as well as Lakes Talkas and Kultuban. Forests cover 126,400 hectares (312,000 acres) (or 24.4% of the total area) with reserves of 18,800,000 cubic meters (660,000,000 cu ft) of timber (with softwood comprising 3,400,000 cubic meters (120,000,000 cu ft) of the reserves). Mineral reserves in the district include the Sibaysky mine, with one of the largest copper reserves in Russia. The district, being located in the Ural Mountains, feels the effects of the Asian continental air and has a mild climate.

== History ==
The district was established on August 20, 1930.

== Administrative and municipal status ==
Within the framework of administrative divisions, Baymaksky District is one of the fifty-four in the Republic of Bashkortostan. It is divided into twenty-two selsoviets, comprising ninety-one rural localities. The town of Baymak serves as its administrative center, despite being incorporated separately as a town of republic significance—an administrative unit with the status equal to that of the districts.

As a municipal division, the district is incorporated as Baymaksky Municipal District, with the town of republic significance of Baymak being incorporated within it as Baymak Urban Settlement. Its twenty-two selsoviets are incorporated as twenty-two rural settlements within the municipal district. The town of Baymak serves as the administrative center of the municipal district as well.

== Towns and settlements ==
- 2nd Turkemenevo
