= Baymak =

Town in Bashkortostan, Russia

Baymak Баймак
- Town

Other transcription(s)
  - Bashkir: Баймаҡ; Bajmaq
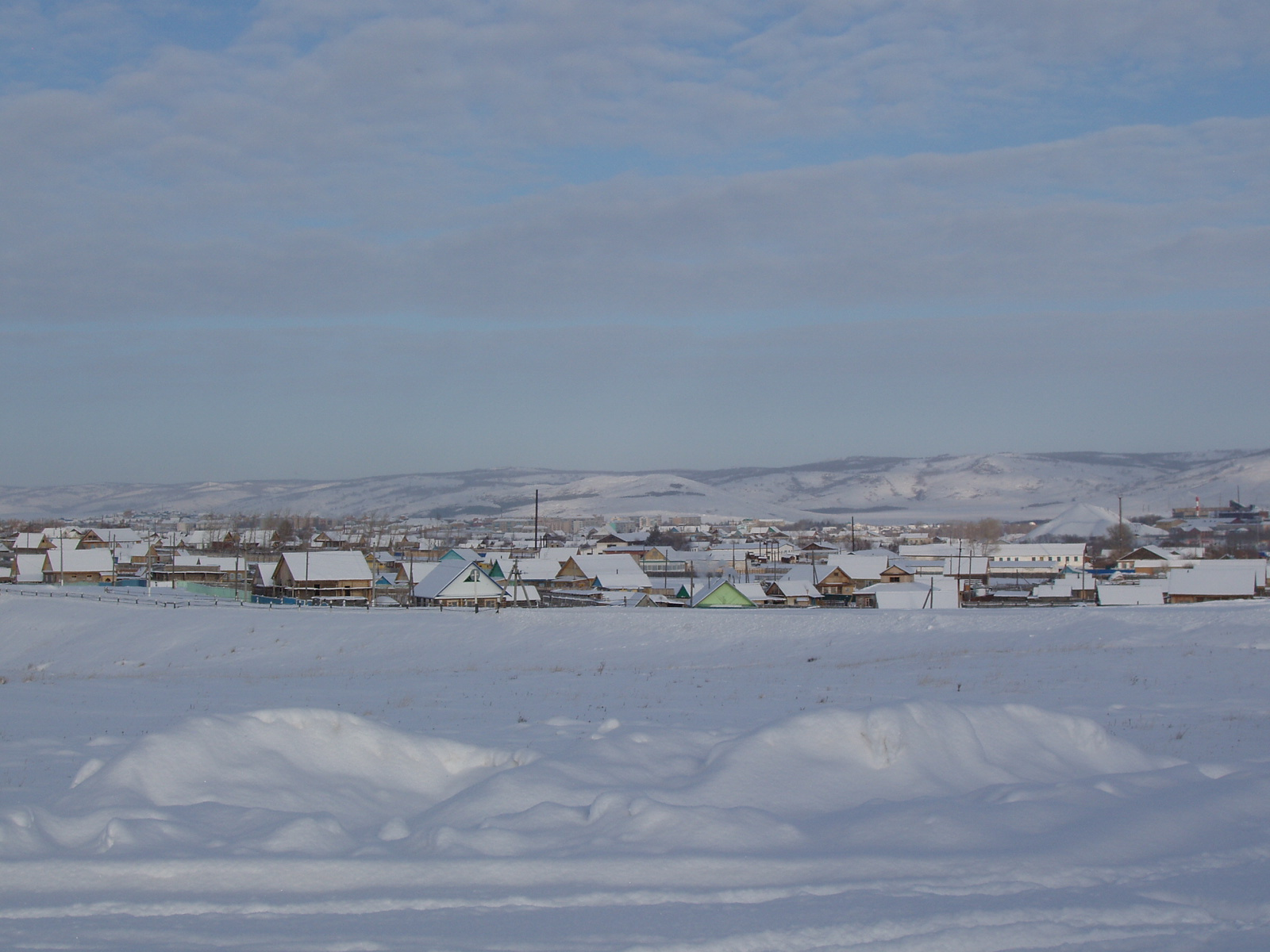
- Baymak in the winter

- Coat of arms
- Interactive map of Baymak
- Location of Baymak Baymak (Bashkortostan)
- Coordinates: 52°35′N 58°19′E
- Country: Russia
- Federal subject: Bashkortostan
- Founded: 1913
- Town status since: 1938
- Elevation: 500 m (1,600 ft)

Population (2010 Census)
  - Total: 17,710
  - Estimate (2021): 17,833 (+0.7%)

Administrative status
  - Subordinated to: town of republic significance of Baymak
  - Capital of: Baymaksky District, town of republic significance of Baymak

Municipal status
  - Municipal district: Baymaksky Municipal District
  - Urban settlement: Baymak Urban Settlement
  - Capital of: Baymaksky Municipal District, Baymak Urban Settlement
- Time zone: UTC+5 (MSK+2)
- Postal code: 453630
- OKTMO ID: 80606101001

Baymak (Russian: Баймак; Bashkir: Баймаҡ, Bajmaq, Bashkir pronunciation: [bɑjˈmɑq]) is a town in the Republic of Bashkortostan, Russia, located in the upper streams of the Tanalyk River (Ural's basin) 489 kilometers (304 mi) south of Ufa. Population: 17,710 (2010 census); 17,223 (2002 census); 15,976 (1989 Soviet census).

== History ==
It was founded in 1913; town status was granted to it in 1938.

In January 2024, about 10,000 protesters called for the release of activist Fail Alsynov after he had been sentenced to four years in prison.

== Administrative and municipal status ==
Within the framework of administrative divisions, Baymak serves as the administrative center of Baymaksky District, even though it is not a part of it. As an administrative division, it is incorporated separately as the town of republic significance of Baymak—an administrative unit with the status equal to that of the districts. As a municipal division, the town of republic significance of Baymak is incorporated within Baymaksky Municipal District as Baymak Urban Settlement.

== Demographics ==
Ethnic composition:

- Bashkirs: 78.48%
- Russians: 17.25%
- Tatars: 5.1%
