= Special Coordinating Council for Security Enhancement =

Government agencies in Russia

Special Coordinating Council for Security Enhancement (Russian: Специальный координационный совет по повышению безопасности), or just the Special Coordinating Council, is a body of the Russian government, announced by Russian president Vladimir Putin on 19 October 2022 at a meeting of the Security Council immediately after the declaration of martial law in the annexed territories of Ukraine, which Russia considers its regions. The Special Coordinating Council will be headed by Russian prime minister Mikhail Mishustin.

The council will include vice-premiers, representatives of law enforcement agencies, the socio-economic part of government, the Presidential Administration and the State Council.

The council will coordinate the supply and repair of weapons, military and special equipment, and in addition, monitor the conduct of repair, restoration, construction, installation and other work, and control logistics.

== History ==
=== Formation ===
The Russian government will draft a decree “in order to meet the needs that arise during the conduct of a special military operation (including in terms of the supply and repair of weapons, military and special equipment, materiel, medical maintenance, repair and construction works and logistics, and other),” a Kremlin statement read.

The council will hold its first meeting early next week (24-30 October), Russian state media RIA Novosti reported.

== See also ==
- State Defense Committee
- Council of Labor and Defense
