= Emergency medical services in Russia =

Nationwide ambulance service of Russia

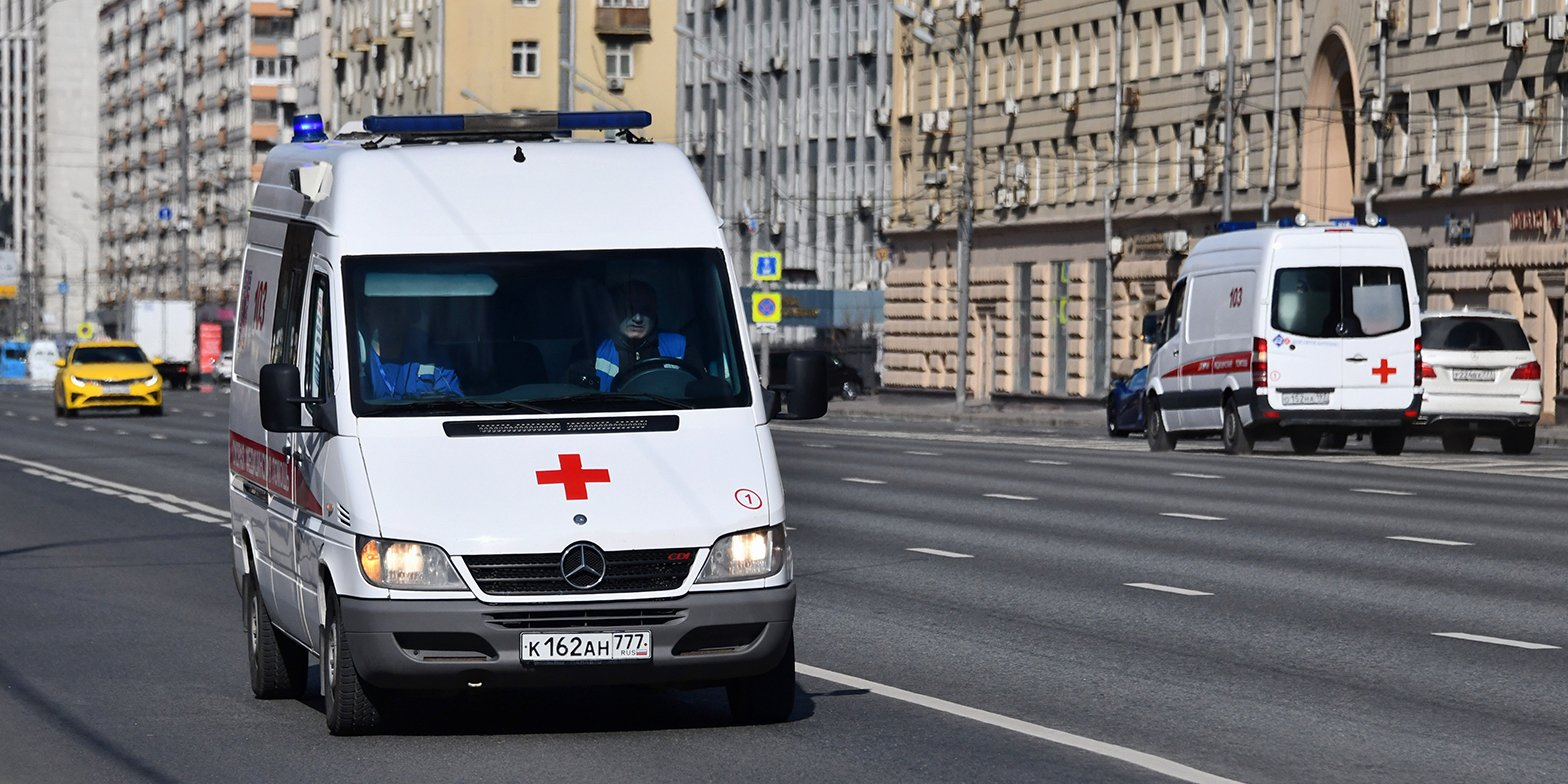
Two Mercedes-Benz Sprinter ambulances traveling in opposite directions in Moscow

Emergency medical services (Russian: Скорая Медицинская Помощь, romanized: Skoraya Meditsinskaya Pomoshch, lit. 'Emergency Medical Help') in Russia is a type of medical assistance provided to citizens in cases of accident, illnesses, injuries, poisonings, and other conditions requiring urgent medical intervention. These services are typically provided by a city or regional government, public emergency hospital, or the Disaster Medical Service. The emergency number for dialing an ambulance in Russia is 03 or 103, the generic European 112 can be use in some areas. 03 is called by landlines only while 103 and 112 can be called from mobile phones.

== History ==
In the Russian Empire, emergency medical services first appeared in 1897 in Warsaw, Poland when an ambulance station was established. after the Then stations were inaugurated in the cities of Lodz, Vilnius, Kyiv, Odessa, Riga, Kharkiv, Saint Petersburg and Moscow. The appearance of ambulances on the streets of Moscow can be attributed to 1898. Until that time, the victims, who were usually collected by policemen and firefighters, were transported to the emergency rooms under the auspices of the police stations. The medical examination required in such cases was absent and often seriously injured people spent hours without adequate assistance. In Moscow, the first two ambulances appeared as part of the police units in April 1898. The carriages were purchased with private donations from the merchant Kuznetsova, who also financed the work of the stations at the beginning. In St. Petersburg, the first five ambulance stations were opened on March 7, 1899 at the initiative of surgeon Nikolai Velyaminov. The ambulance station in Odessa, which began its work on April 29, 1903, was established on the initiative and at the expense of Count M.M. Tolstoy.

Since the beginning of the 20th century, subsidies have partially financed the operation of the ambulance stations. In the middle of 1902, 7 ambulances were in service in Moscow, operating from Sushchevsky, Sretensky, Lefortovo, Tagansky, Yakimanka, and Presnensky police stations, and in the Prechistensky fire station. The service radius was limited to the boundaries of these police units. The first carriage to transport women appeared in the maternity hospital of the Harushin brothers in 1903 and yet, the available forces were not enough to support the growing city.

In St. Petersburg, each of the five ambulance stations was equipped with two steam wagons, 4 pairs of hand stretchers and everything required for first aid. Each station had 2 workers on duty (there were no doctors on duty) whose job it was to transport the victims through the streets and squares of the city to the hospital or the station. The first commander of all the first aid stations under the Red Cross Society Committee was G.I.

One year after the opening of the stations (in 1900) the central station appeared and in 1905 the sixth first aid station was opened. Until 1909, the organization of first aid (ambulance) in St. Petersburg was presented in the following form: the central station, which directed and regulated the work of all regional stations and also received all calls for an ambulance. In 1912, a group of 50 doctors agreed to go for free to call the station to provide first aid.

Since 1908 the Ambulance Association has been established by enthusiastic volunteers with private donations. For several years, the association tried to reallocate the police ambulance stations, considering that their work was not efficient enough. In 1912, in Moscow, the first ambulance, equipped according to a project by Dr. Vladimir Petrovich Pommertsov, was purchased with the private funds collected and the Dolgorukovskaya ambulance station was opened. Doctors - members of the association and students from the Faculty of Medicine worked at the station. Help was given in public places.

With the outbreak of the First World War, the personnel of the ambulance services were transferred to the military department and operated as part of it. During the February Revolution of 1917, an emergency medical unit was created where ambulance units were organized. On July 18, 1919, the first independent ambulance station was organized, which was not subordinate to police stations or hospitals. Three rooms were allocated to the area of the new station in the left wing of the Sheremetyevo Hospital (now the Sklifosovsky Institute for Emergency Medicine). Over the years the service grew and received more and more vehicles and ambulances. When, in the first years of the existence of the ambulance unit in Moscow, it served only during accidents. Patients at home (regardless of the severity of their condition) did not receive assistance. An emergency room for patients was organized in Moscow in 1926. Doctors drove to the patients on motorcycles with sidecars and then in cars. After that, emergency medical treatment was separated into a separate independent service and transferred to the authority of the district health departments.

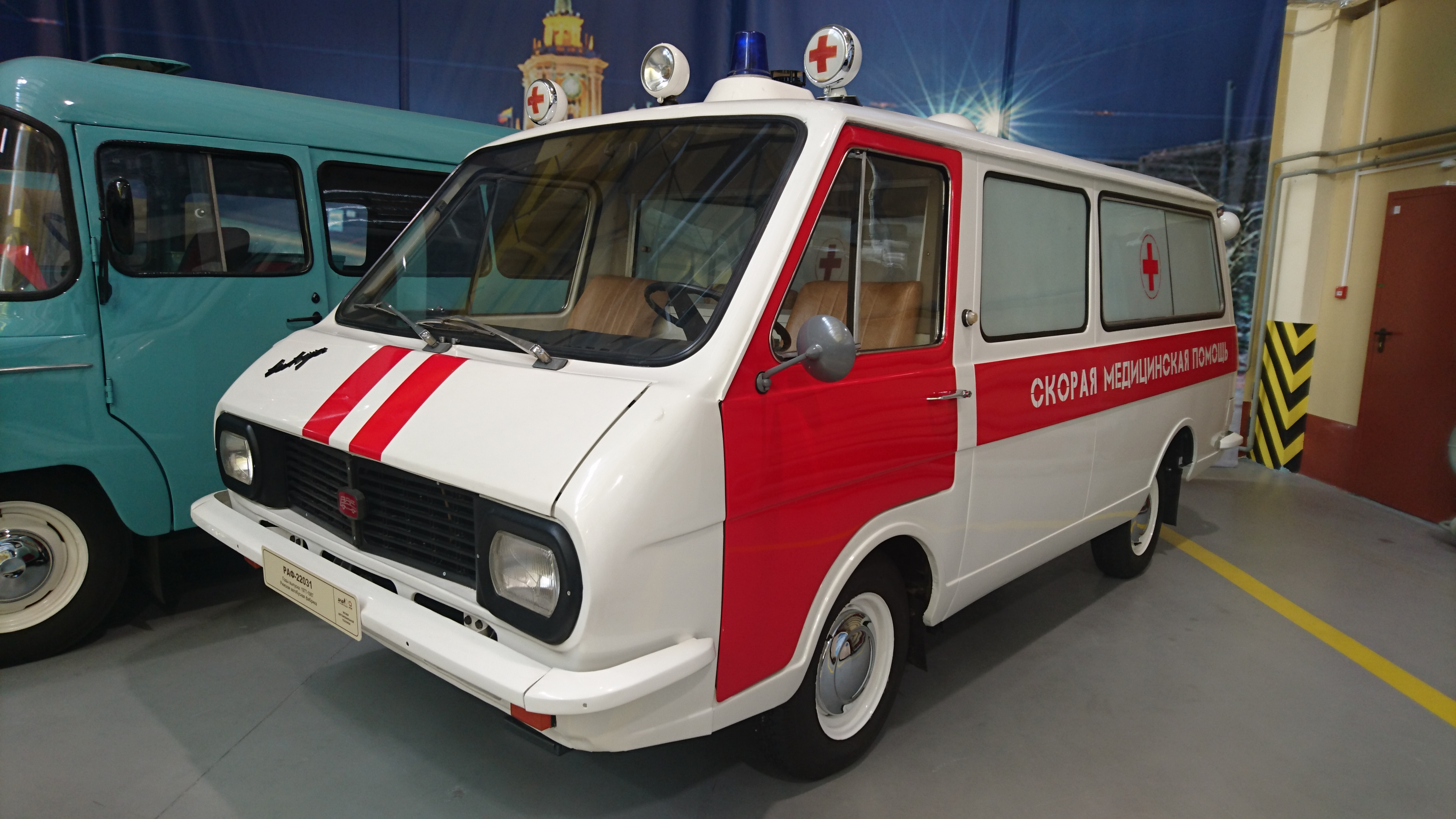
RAF -22031 from the collection of the UMMC Automotive Museum, The RAF 22031 was once the most common ambulance in Russia

After the dissolution of the Soviet Union, in 1995 the activity of the emergency medicine service was organized within the Ministry of Emergencies and Civil Defense. Since January 1, 2013, the financial support for emergency medical services is carried out at the expense of the Federal Mandatory Health Insurance Fund. In accordance with Russian legislation, emergency and urgent care is provided free of charge to all citizens. Thus, even in the absence of a mandatory medical insurance policy, the ambulance crew is prohibited from leaving anyone without help. Payment for ambulance services is made from the municipal budget that subsidizes emergency medical services.

== Overview ==
An ambulance is staffed of any combination of doctors, nurses and feldshers (a combination of a physicians assistant and paramedic), plus an ambulance driver selected from an agency that trains them to be professional ambulance drivers. Ambulances are staffed at minimum by a nurse and feldsher. The driver’s task is only driving and does not have any medical qualifications or even specialized driver's training.

== System configuration ==
=== Ambulance Types ===
Russian ambulances are painted in accordance with GOST R 50574-2002 (ГОСТ Р 50574-2002 г) which requires an overall white with contrasting red doors, red front and rear vertical stripes and red horizontal side stripes. Undercarriages are painted black. Modern vehicles lack the red doors and the hood stripes are replaced with either a red cross or an emergency telephone number. All lettering or numbers are of the opposite color of the color it is on.

Class A
A non-emergency patient transport vehicle used to shuttle patients between hospitals, clinics, and other medical facilities.

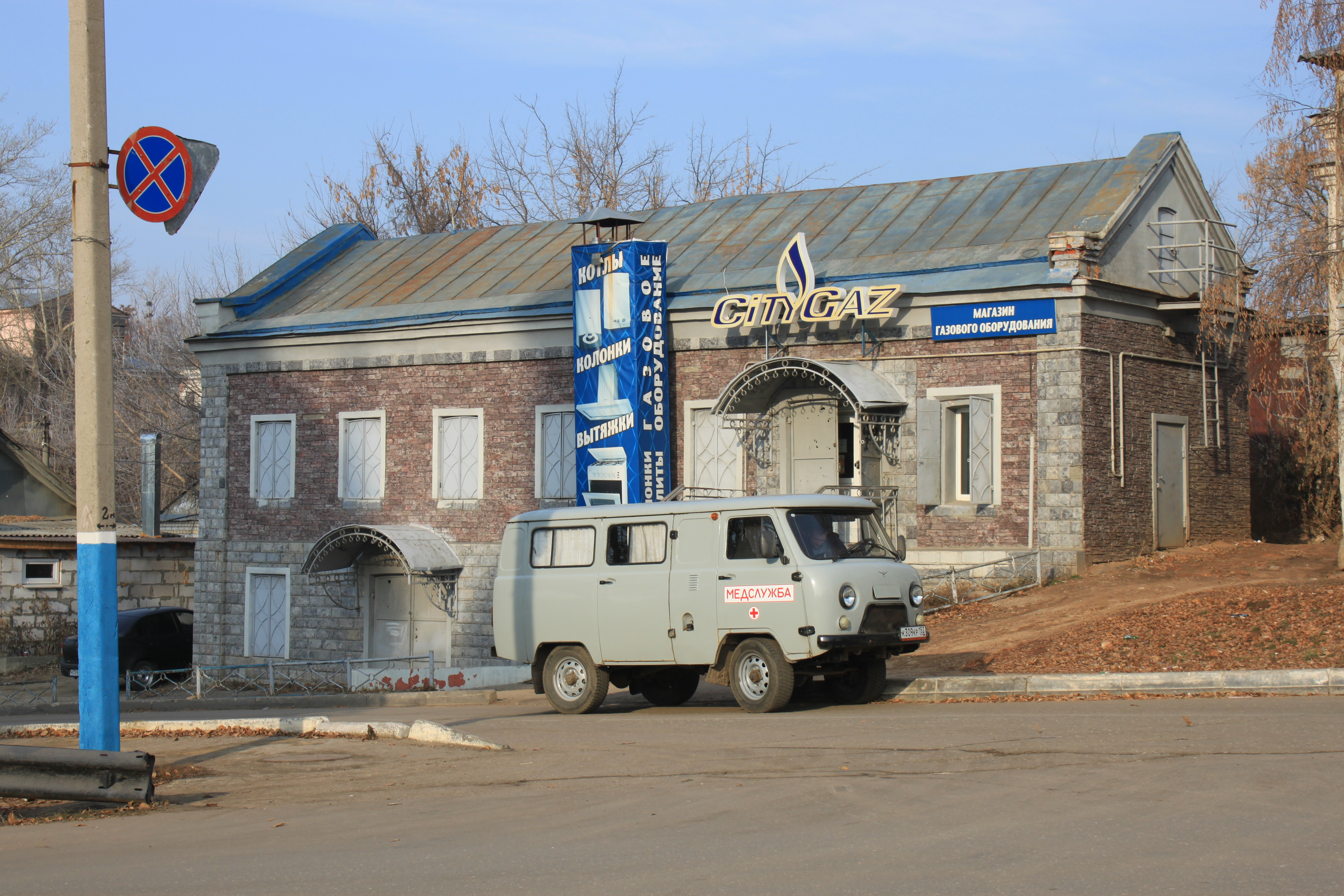
UAZ 452 "medical" car

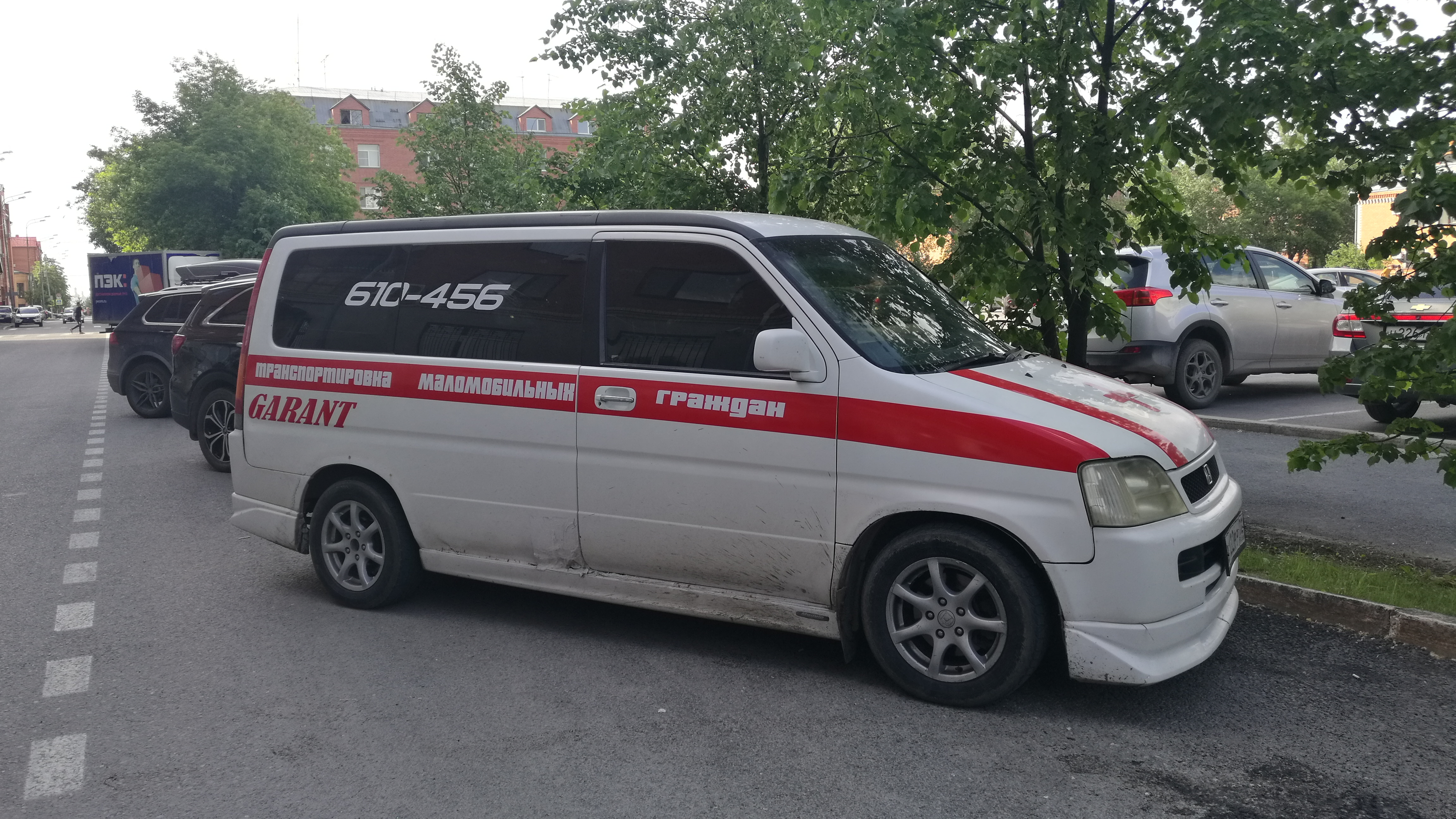
Medical transport vehicle in Tyumen, Russia

Class B
Emergency ambulance staffed with feldshers trained and operating in Basic Life Support (BLS).

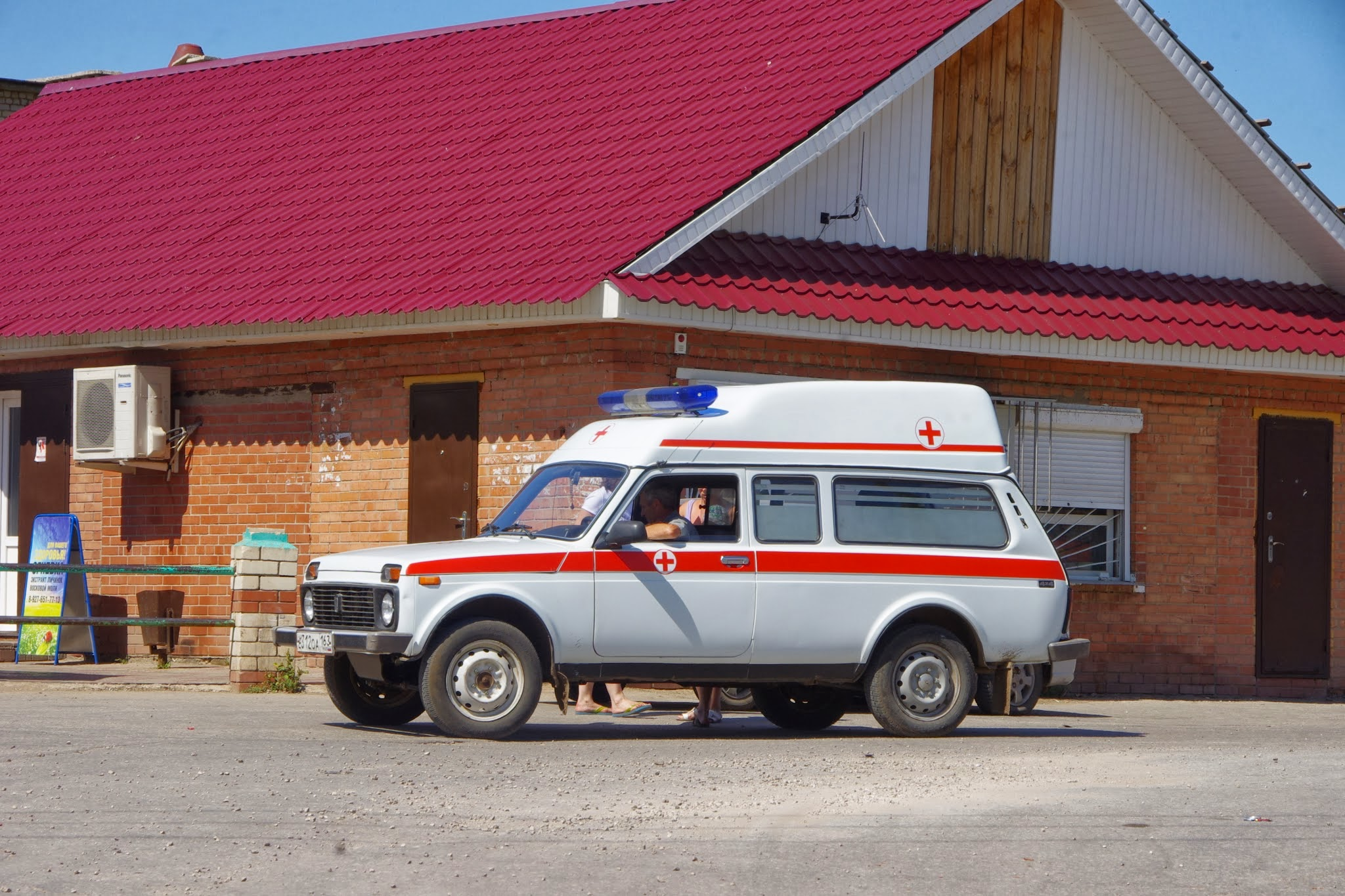
Rural 4x4 Lada Niva ambulance

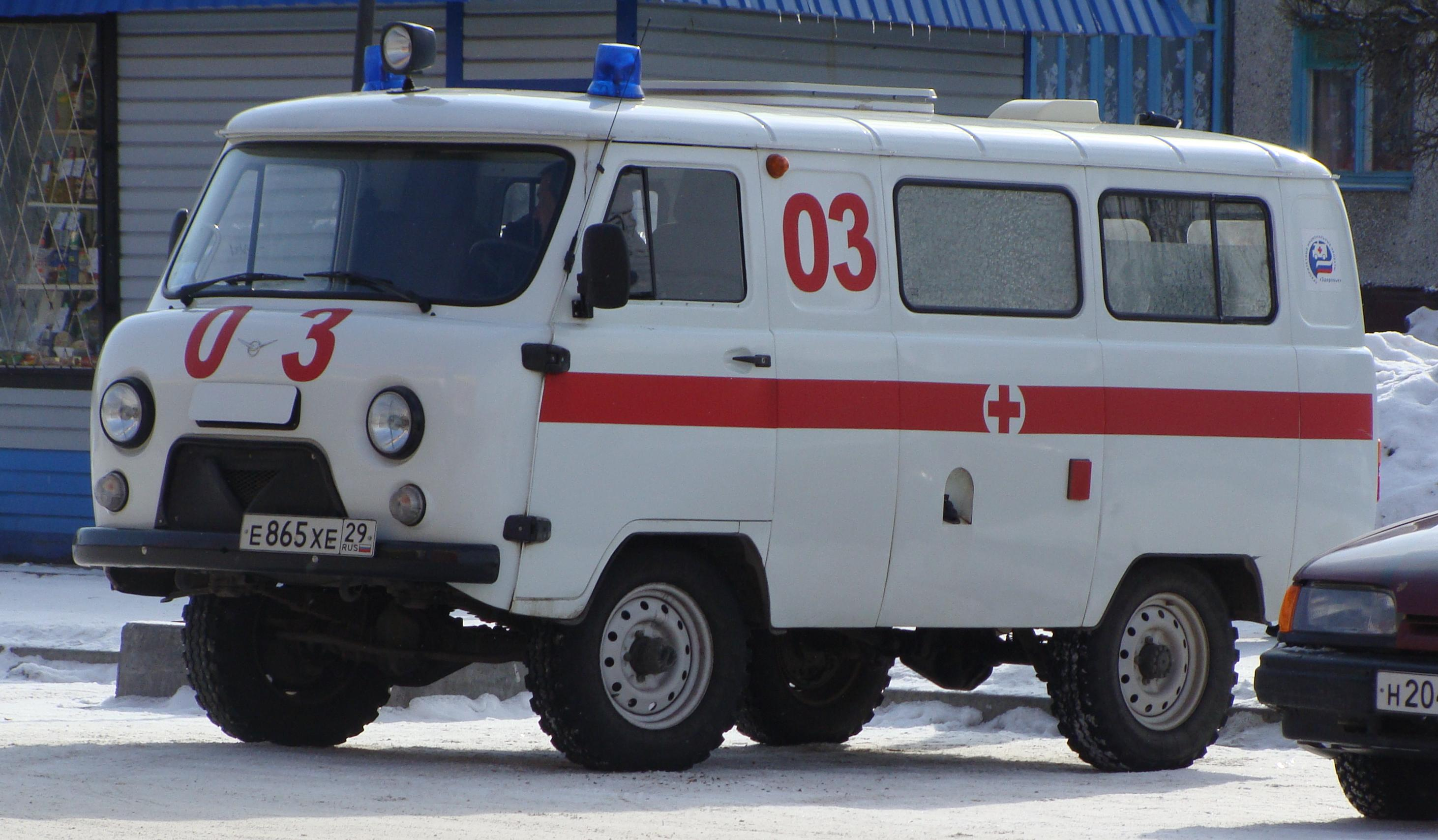
"Sanitarka" UAZ-3962 Class B all-wheel drive van common in rural areas of Russia

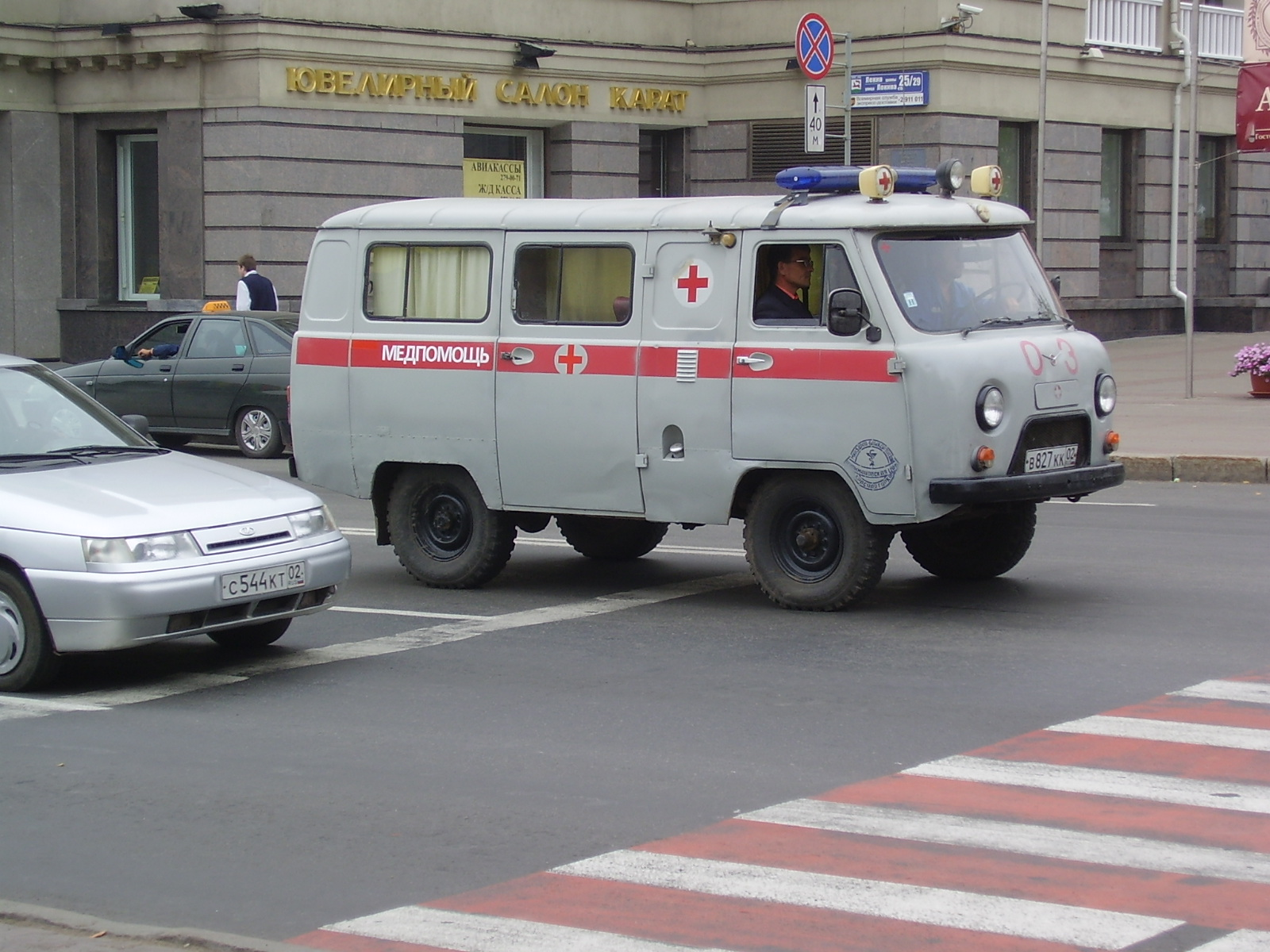
Older non-white UAZ-3962 ambulance in Ulan-Ude

Class C
Specialty Ambulance. In addition to the basic ambulance teams, various types of specialty units can respond, depending on what advanced patient care is needed. The most common is a "reanimobil", or a "resuscitation ambulance". These are Advanced Life Support (ALS) units that respond to cardiac arrest, stroke, severe trauma, and other severe medical emergencies. Other types of specialty ambulances include cardiac, surgical, OB, pediatric, intensive care, and respiratory. All of these units carry state-of-the-art equipment, a specialty emergency physician, and some combination of a feldsher and nurse. These specialty ambulances are typically painted yellow to distinguish them from the generic white emergency ambulances.

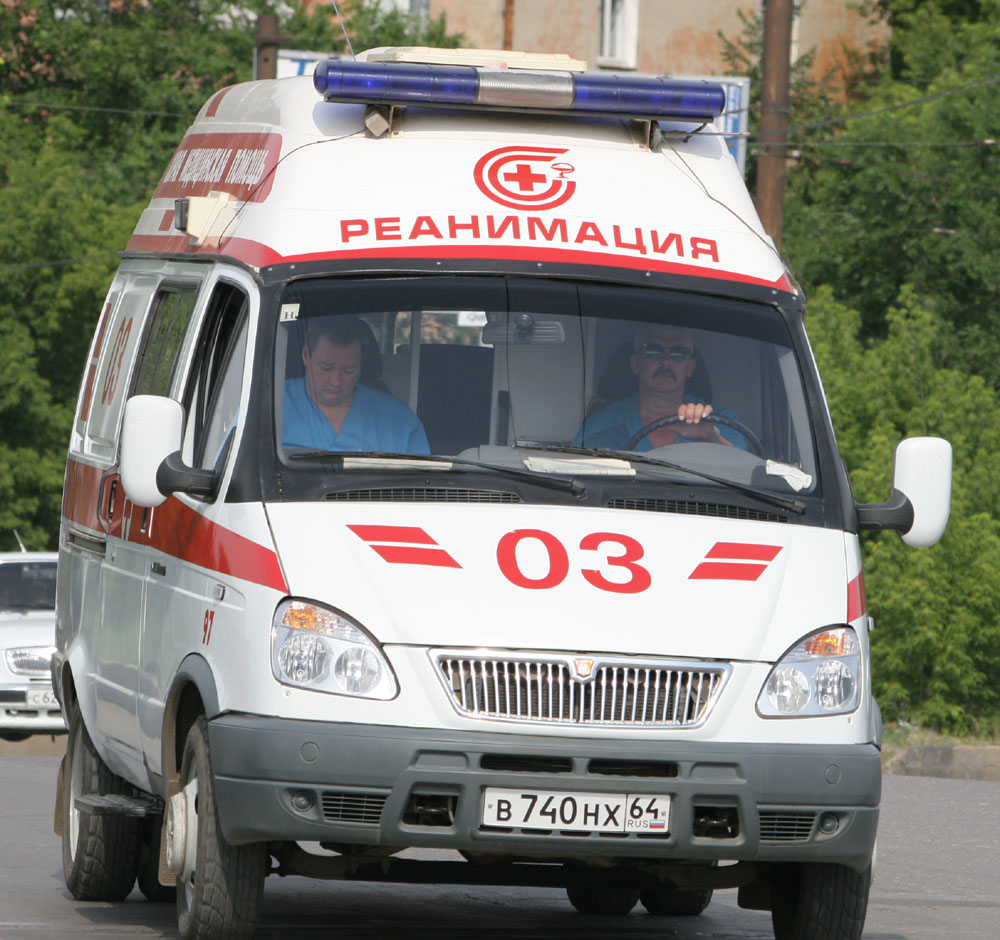
White GAZ Gazelle Reanimobil Class C ambulance

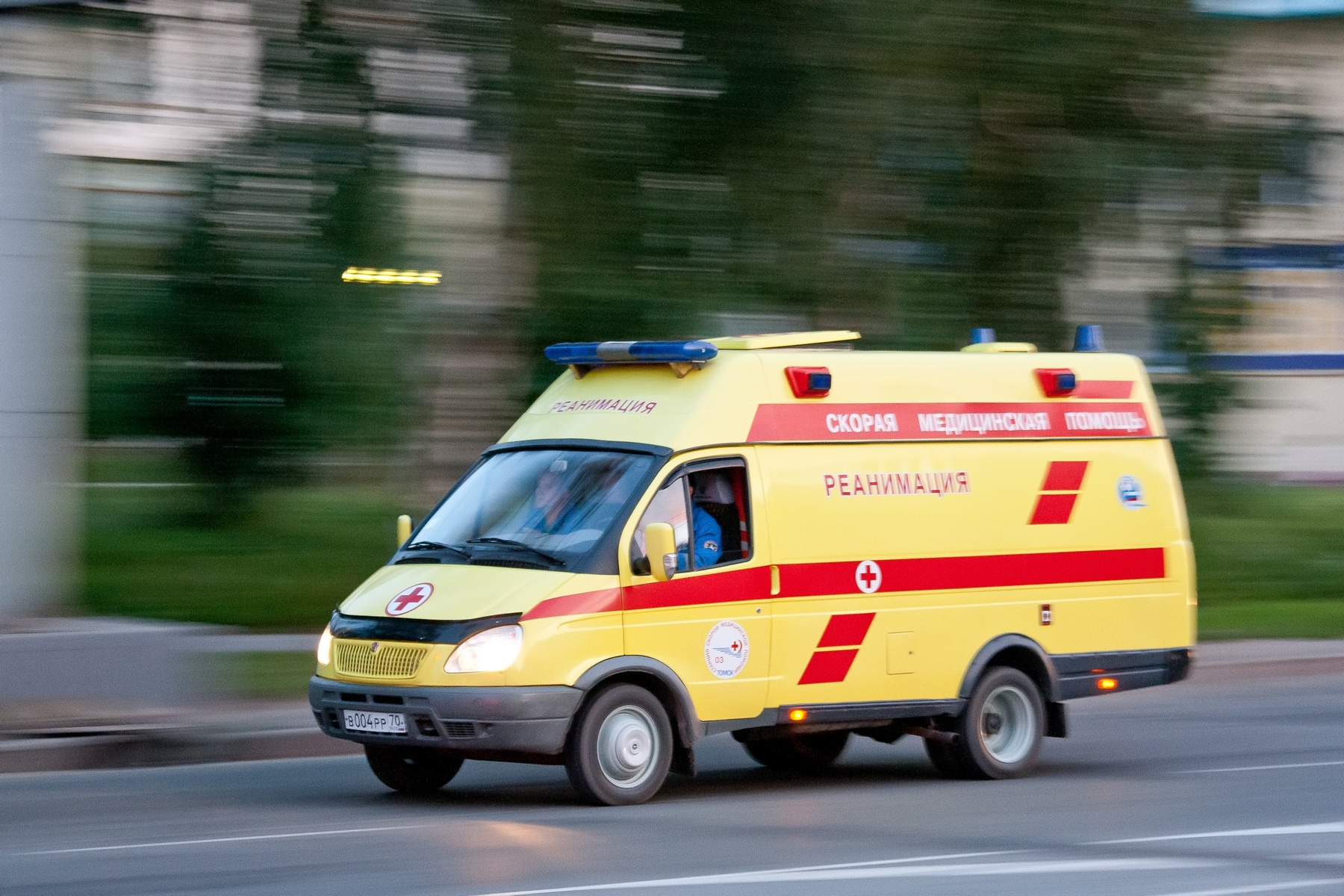
Yellow Reanimobile

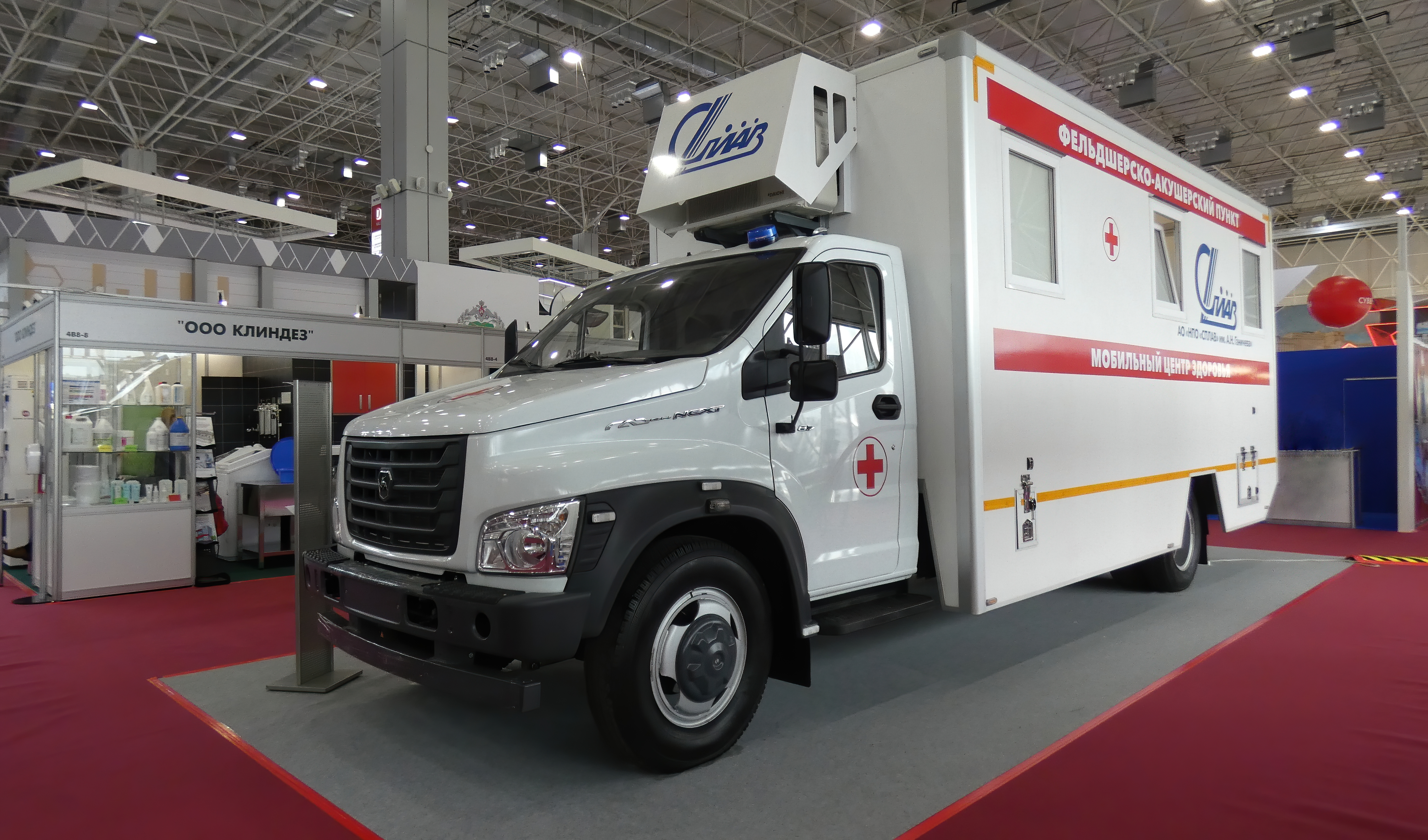
Mobile medical and obstetric center from "Splav" SPA during the "Armiya 2021" exhibition.

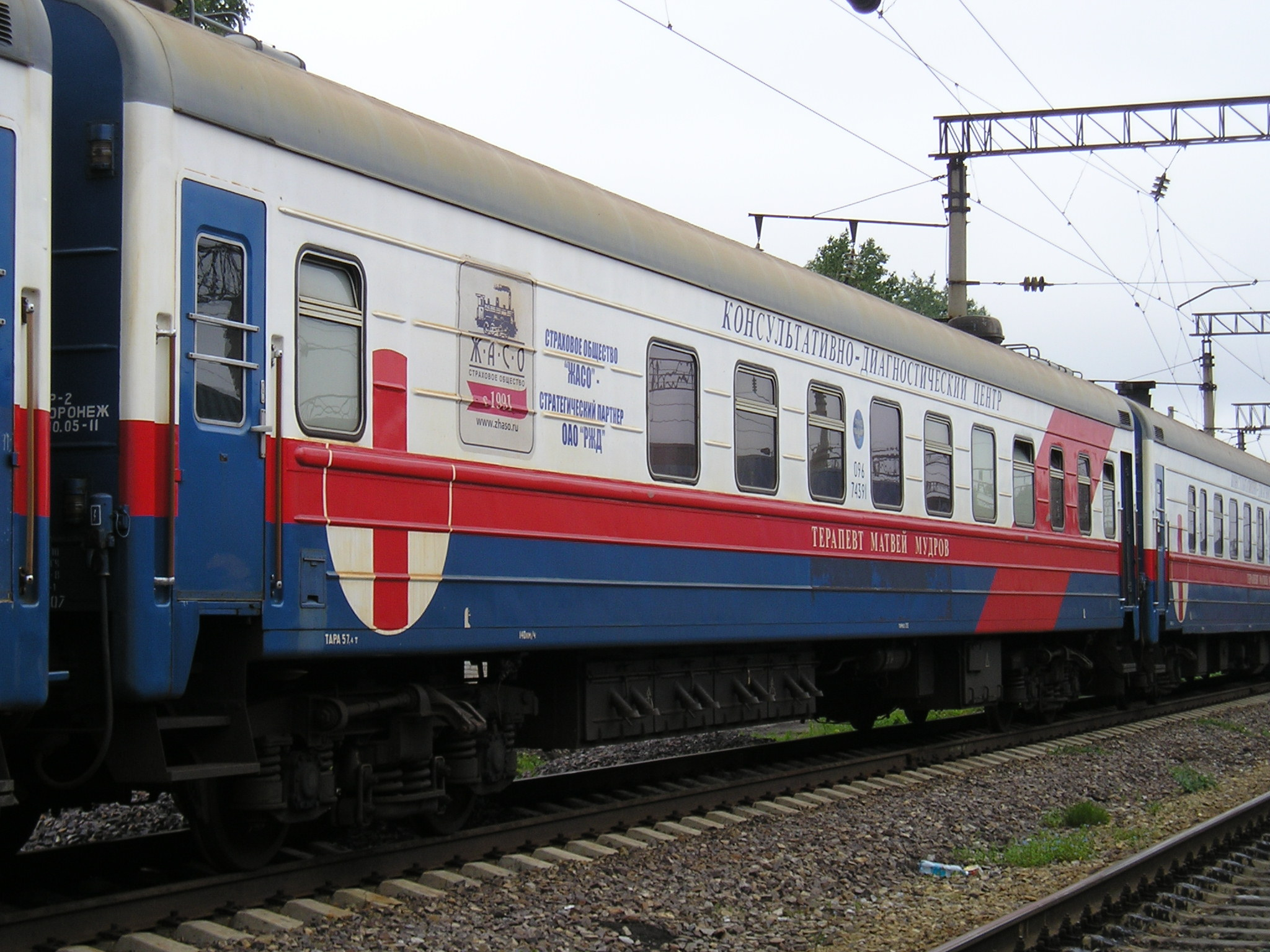
Ambulance train

== Other emergency services ==
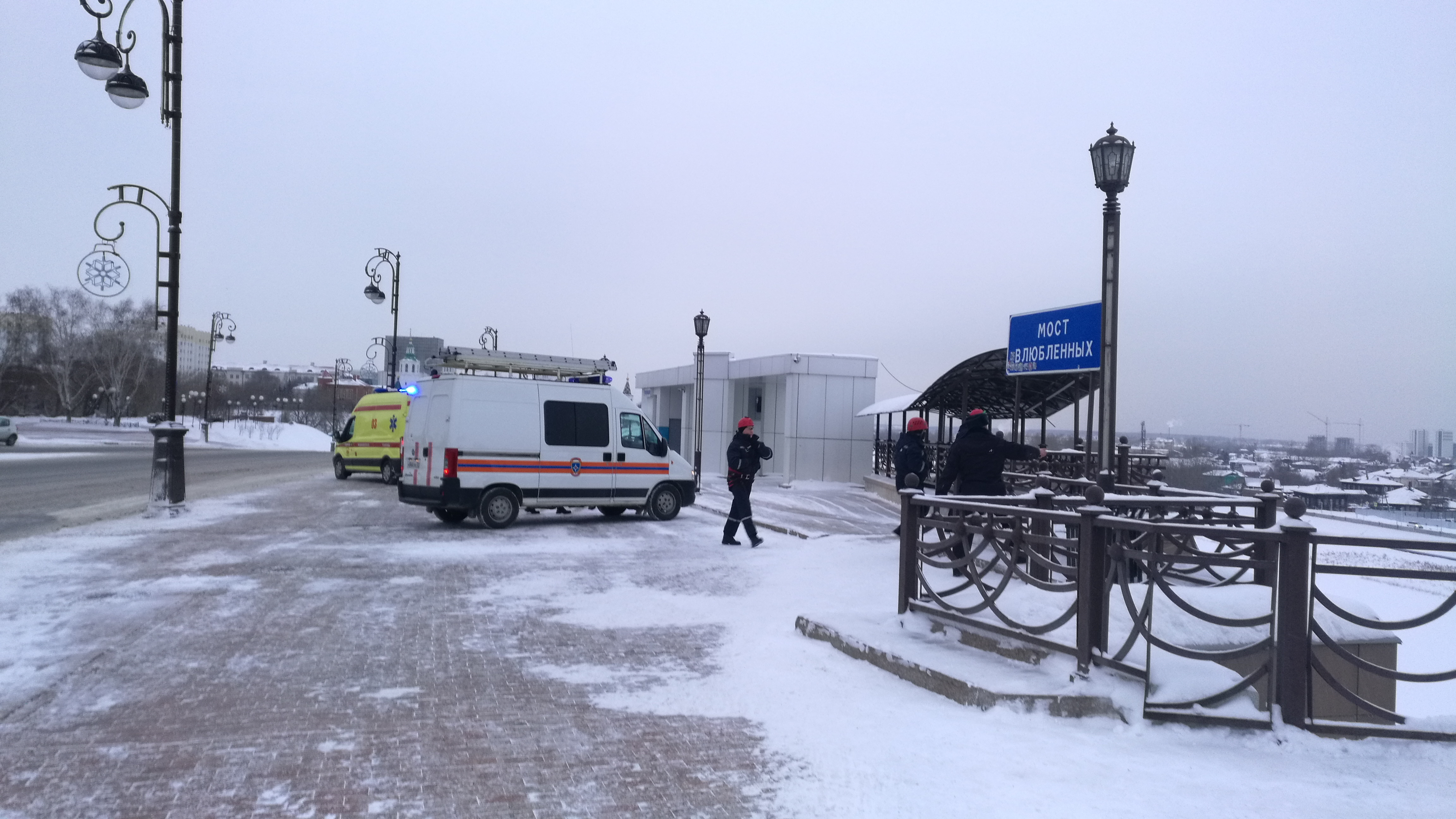
Ambulance and EMERCOM rescue vehicle on a call

Rescue Service
А technical rescue brigade provided by a city or regional government or EMERCOM depending on location. These units respond to motor vehicle accidents, building collapses, water rescues, and rope rescue situations. The teams extricate or rescue the victim from the dangerous situation, stabilize the victim, and hand them over to the ambulance.

== See also ==
- State of emergency in Russia
- Russian Red Cross Society
- Martial law in Russia
- Russian System of Disaster Management
- Healthcare in Russia
- Main Directorate of Special Programs of the President of the Russian Federation
- Federal Agency for State Reserves (Russia)
