= 2022 Russian martial law =

Martial law introduced in federal subjects of Russia in 2022

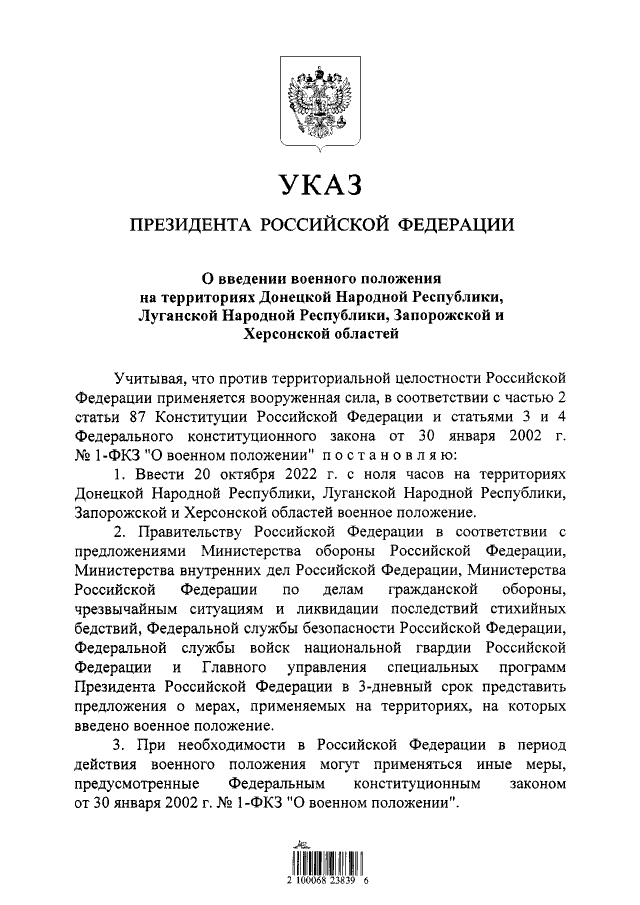
- First page of the Russian Presidential Decree "On the introduction of martial law in the territories of the Donetsk People's Republic, Luhansk People's Republic, and Zaporizhzhia and Kherson Regions"
- Date: 20 October 2022–present
- Location: Russia or occupied Ukraine
- Also known as: Maximum level of response, Average level of response, Level of high readiness, Level of basic readiness

Martial law in Russia was introduced on 20 October 2022 during the ongoing Russian invasion of Ukraine and a month after the announcement of mobilization. President Vladimir Putin issued two decrees: "On the introduction of martial law in the territories of the DPR, LPR, Zaporozhye and Kherson Oblasts" and "On measures taken in the constituent entities of the Russian Federation in connection with Decree of the President of the Russian Federation dated October 19, 2022 No. 756".

Martial law has been introduced in full on the territories of Ukraine annexed by Russia (Donetsk People's Republic, Luhansk People's Republic, Kherson Oblast, Zaporizhzhia Oblast). In the regions bordering Ukraine - Bryansk, Kursk, Belgorod, Voronezh, Rostov Oblasts, Krasnodar Krai, as well as in the annexed Crimea and Sevastopol, a "medium level of response" was introduced, in other regions of the Central and the Southern Federal Districts - "level of high readiness", and in other subjects of the Russian Federation - "level of basic readiness".

Officials said after the decrees were issued that no measures were planned to restrict life and freedom of movement.

The martial law regime was introduced for the first time in the modern history of Russia. The last time martial law was imposed in Russia was by the Soviet authorities in May 1943 during the Second World War.

== Background ==
=== Previous legislative novels ===
On September 20, the State Duma unanimously adopted amendments to include the concepts of "martial law" and "wartime" in the Criminal Code, and the introduction of several articles related to military operations. The law also introduced criminal punishment for failure to comply with an order during a period of "martial law" or "wartime".

== Declaration ==
On 19 October 2022, Russian president Vladimir Putin, at the beginning of a meeting of the Security Council of Russia dedicated to migration policy, announced the signing of a decree on the introduction of martial law in the territories of Ukraine annexed in early October 2022. The martial law regime allows the introduction of restrictive measures: curfew, seizure of private property, restriction of entry / exit and freedom of movement, internment of foreigners, forced relocation of local residents, prohibition of rallies and strikes, and others. The President added that "before becoming part of Russia", a "martial law regime" was already in effect in these territories, and the decree was signed to "register this regime already within the framework of Russian legislation". In addition, in the subjects bordering Ukraine, a "medium-level response mode" was introduced, allowing to carry out "mobilization measures in the economic sphere" and "territorial defense measures", in the subjects of the CFD and the SFD, a "high alert mode" was introduced, allowing to carry out "activities for territorial defense", as well as to introduce a special regime for facilities that ensure the operation of transport and communications, as well as energy facilities, and in the rest of Russia - a "basic readiness regime". In addition, Putin instructed the government to prepare a draft decree on the establishment of a Special Coordinating Council under the Cabinet of Ministers and submit proposals on measures to be taken in the territories where martial law has been introduced, and also endowed the heads of all Russian regions with additional powers. On the evening of the same day, the Federation Council unanimously approved Putin's decree on the introduction of martial law in the annexed territories.

== Legal acts ==
Paragraph No. 3 of the main decree reads: "If necessary, in the Russian Federation during the period of martial law, other measures provided for by the Federal Constitutional Law of January 30, 2002 No. 1-FKZ "0 martial law" may be applied.

== Reaction ==
Immediately after the decrees were published, Kremlin Press Secretary Dmitry Peskov promised that there were no plans to close the borders. At the same time, Security Council Secretary Nikolai Patrushev said that the Russian authorities would tighten migration control and the responsibility of foreigners for violating the rules of stay.

Moscow Mayor Sergei Sobyanin said that it is not planned to introduce measures restricting life and freedom of movement, similar statements were made in the administrations of the Kursk and Voronezh Oblasts.

== See also ==
- 2022 Russian mobilization

== Normative legal acts and bills ==
- Decree on the introduction of martial law in the territories of the DPR, LPR, Zaporozhye and Kherson Oblasts
- Decree "On measures taken in the constituent entities of the Russian Federation in connection with the Decree of the President of the Russian Federation of October 19, 2022 No. 756"
