= State of emergency in Russia =

Legal status

State of emergency in Russia (Russian: чрезвычайное положение в Российской Федерации) is a special legal regime that is introduced in the country or its regions to protect against an internal threat. The state of emergency involves restricting the rights and freedoms of citizens and legal entities, as well as imposing additional duties on them. In this case, the state of emergency, which is introduced in the case of violent unrest or clash, coup attempt, natural disaster, or man-made disaster, should be distinguished from the martial law regime that is introduced in the event of external aggression.

The procedure for introducing and lifting a state of emergency in Russia is regulated by the federal constitutional law "On the State of Emergency" (2001), which replaced the 1991 law of the same name. Earlier, the State Duma made several attempts to prepare and adopt a law, especially during the state of emergency on parts of the territory of North Ossetia and Ingushetia (1992–1995), but none of these attempts were successful.

== History ==
In Russia, after the dissolution of the Soviet Union, a state of emergency was not introduced at the federal level.

On November 9, 1991, President Boris Yeltsin introduced a state of emergency in Chechen-Ingushetia Republic, where Dzhokhar Dudayev signed a decree on declaration of independence of the Chechnya. However, the Supreme Council of the RSFSR refused to approve this decree, and already on November 11, the state of emergency was terminated.

On November 2, 1992, Yeltsin introduced a state of emergency in Ingushetia and North Ossetia, where an ethnic conflict erupted. A year earlier in Chechnya, a special management procedure was introduced here, and an interim administration was appointed. The head of the interim administration was Federal Deputy Prime Minister Georgy Khizh, his deputy the head of the State Committee for Emergency Situations Sergey Shoigu.

On March 31, 1993, the state of emergency in North Ossetia and Ingushetia was canceled. Instead, the president introduced a state of emergency in parts of the Prigorodny district of North Ossetia and the Nazran district of Ingushetia and in the surrounding areas, which was then extended several times. However, in early 1995, the Federation Council refused to authorize the next extension of this regime, and it was canceled until February 15, 1995.

From October 3 to 4, 1993, Yeltsin introduced a state of emergency in Moscow to suppress protesters against the dispersal of the Supreme Soviet.

== Introduction and сancellation ==
The state of emergency in Russia is introduced by the president under the circumstances stipulated by the law "On the state of emergency", with immediate notification of this to the Federation Council and the State Duma.

The law "On the state of emergency" introduces the concept of goals and circumstances of the state of emergency. A state of emergency is introduced to "eliminate the circumstances that served as the basis for the introduction of a state of emergency, to ensure the protection of the rights and freedoms of man and citizen, and to protect the constitutional order of the Russian Federation".

A state of emergency is introduced only if circumstances constitute "an immediate threat to the life and security of citizens or the constitutional system of the Russian Federation", including:

- attempts to violently change the constitutional system of the Russian Federation, armed rebellion, regional conflicts, etc.
- natural and man-made emergencies, natural disasters, etc. A state of emergency is introduced by presidential decree throughout Russia for not more than 30 days or in certain areas for not more than 60 days with the right to extend them by a new presidential decree. When the objectives of the state of emergency are achieved, it is canceled in whole or in part.

The presidential decree on introducing a state of emergency does not require prior coordination with the leadership of the constituent entities of the Federation. Still, it must be approved by the Federation Council "as soon as possible" within 72 hours from the decree's promulgation date. A decree automatically loses force if not approved by the Federation Council after three days. A presidential decree to extend a state of emergency requires the same approval by the Federation Council.

Moreover, the decree is subject to immediate official publication and immediate publication by radio and television.

The state of emergency is ensured mainly by the internal affairs bodies, the penal system, federal security agencies, the national guard, and rescuers. In exceptional cases, the military may be used to restrict entry, protect critical infrastructure, separate the warring parties, suppress the activities of illegal armed groups, eliminate emergencies, and save people. At the same time, all troops in the emergency zone are transferred to operational subordination to a single federal agency.

== Permissible limitations ==
A presidential decree on the imposition of a state of emergency should contain "an exhaustive list of temporary restrictions on the rights and freedoms of citizens of the Russian Federation, foreign citizens and stateless persons, the rights of organizations and public associations".

The State of Emergency Act provides three groups of time limits the president may impose.

- General restrictions:
  - Suspension of powers of regional and local authorities and the operation of regional and local laws contrary to the state of emergency decree;
  - Restriction of freedom of movement, entry and exit, traffic, inspection of vehicles;
  - Strengthening the protection of public order and critical infrastructure, stopping hazardous industries;
  - Restriction of economic and financial activities, a special procedure for the turnover of food and necessities;
  - Prohibition of mass events and strikes;
  - Evacuation of valuables if there is a real threat of their abduction or damage.
- Restrictions in the event of a riot or coup attempt:
  - Curfew, expulsion of nonresident violators of the regime;
  - Censorship;
  - Checking documents, personal items, vehicles and housing;
  - Restriction of the sale of weapons, dangerous substances, drugs, drugs and alcohol, their temporary withdrawal from citizens;
  - Extension of arrest for suspects of severe crimes – for the entire duration of the state of emergency.
- Limitations in the event of natural or man-made disasters:
  - Temporary relocation to safe areas;
  - Quarantine;
  - Mobilization of any organizations and their reorientation for emergency needs;
  - Removal of heads of state organizations incapable of providing a state of emergency;
  - Mobilization of residents and their vehicles for rescue operations, which at the same time are supposed to pay the labor of mobilized residents, compensation for the used property.
  - The creation of extraordinary courts or expedited proceedings is prohibited; the judicial system and the prosecutor's office operate in the same form. Expanding the use of physical force, special means, and weapons is forbidden.

== Order management ==
The State of Emergency Act provides for three options for managing emergencies. The first, basic, involves the creation of a commandant's office. The second and third are called "special management" and are introduced in challenging conditions.

=== Conventional management and commandant's office ===
When a state of emergency is introduced, elections and referendums are not held, and the powers of elected authorities, local authorities, and officials in the area of emergency are automatically extended. If the regime is introduced throughout the country, the Federation Council and the State Duma will continue to work throughout its operation.

The President appoints a commandant in the state of emergency zone who manages law enforcement officers and the military. The commandant provides the state of emergency, determines the procedure for applying the restrictions, invites the president to introduce additional ones, and participates in the work of any state or local authorities on his territory. The commandant can create a joint operational headquarters to coordinate the actions of various forces and means.

The law allows for introducing "special management" of the territory in which the state of emergency is declared after a corresponding warning addressed by the president to the population and officials of state authorities of a constituent entity of the Russian Federation and local authorities operating in such territory.

=== Temporary special management ===
The temporary special territorial authority takes over the powers of regional and local authorities, in whole or in part. The president appoints the head of this body, and the commandant becomes his first deputy.

=== Federal office ===
The federal governing body replaces the temporary special body if it has failed in its tasks. The president appoints its head, and the commandant becomes his first deputy. At the same time, the federal body fully assumes the powers of regional and local authorities.

== See also ==
- Martial law in Russia
- Russian System of Disaster Management
- Emergency medical services in Russia
- Main Directorate of Special Programs of the President of the Russian Federation
- Federal Agency for State Reserves (Russia)
- Freedom of assembly in Russia
