= Federal Agency for State Reserves =

- федеральное агентство по государственным резервам Российской Федерации
- Emblem of Federal Agency for State Reserves

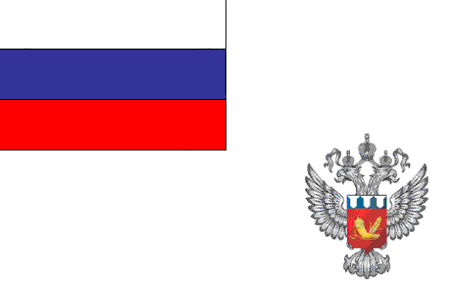
- Flag of Federal Agency for State Reserves

Agency overview
- Formed: March 9, 2004
- Jurisdiction: Government of Russia
- Headquarters: 6 Bolshoy Cherkassy Lane, Moscow; 54°45′24″N 37°37′35″E
- Employees: 330
- Agency executive: Dmitry Gagin
- Parent agency: Government of Russia
- Website: rosrezerv.gov.ru
- Building details
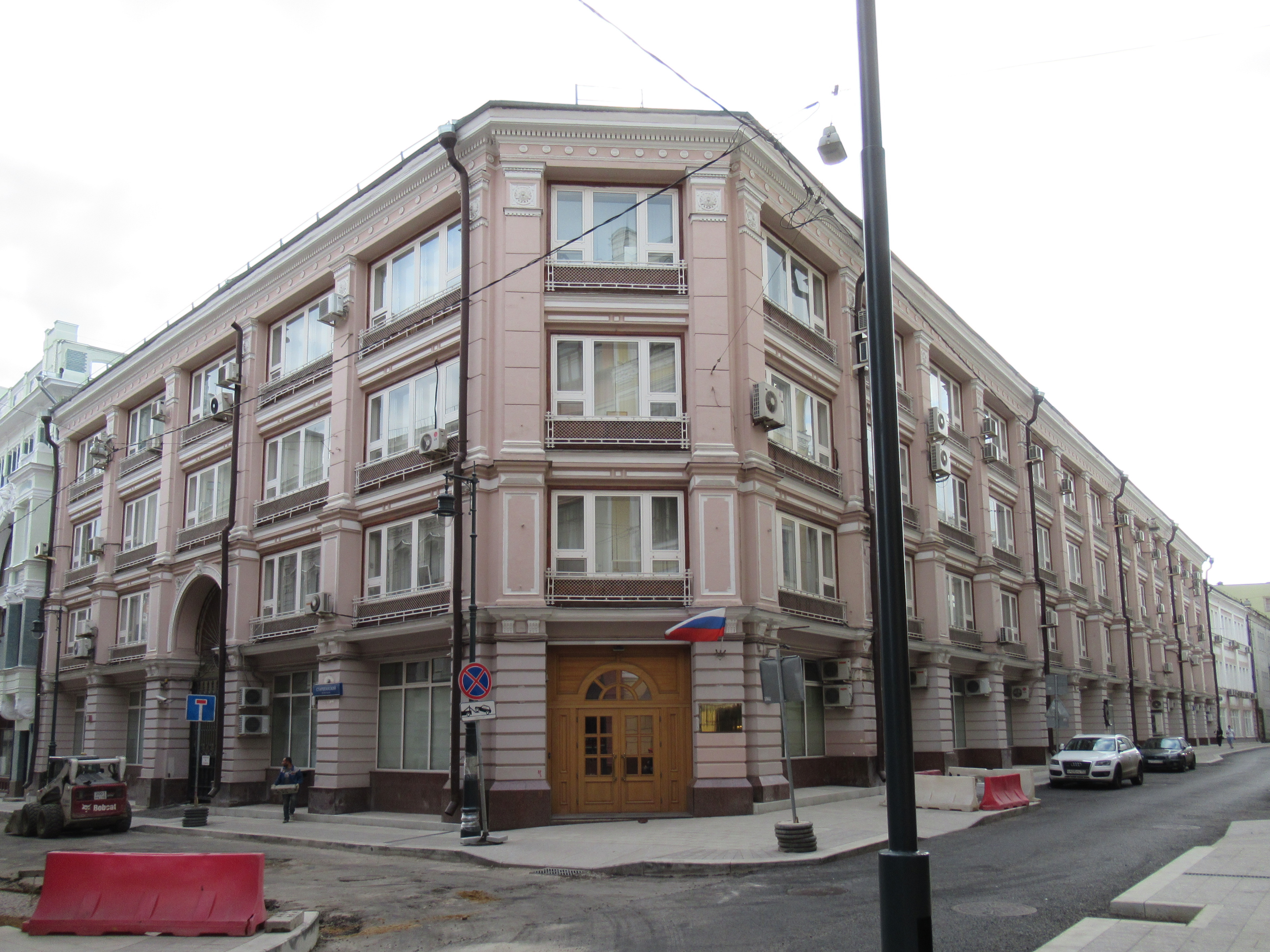
- Headquarters of the service at 6 Bolshoy Cherkassky Lane

The Federal Agency for State Reserves (FASR, Russian: Федеральное агентство по государственным резервам) is an executive body of the Government of Russia which manages the state reserves of the Russian Federation. The Agency is responsible for storing, securing and managing reserves of food, equipment and fuel owned by the Russian state for times of emergency, and state support for different sectors of the economy in times of instability, delivery of necessary resources and food as well as humanitarian assistance and market regulation. The agency acts as the official Food bank of the Russian Federation and is the main governmental body for food security and freeganism. As of 2009 the agency was headed by Dmitry Gogin. The agency has territorial branches throughout the Russian Federation.

The head of the FASR is one of the permanent members of the Security Council of the Russian Federation.

== History ==
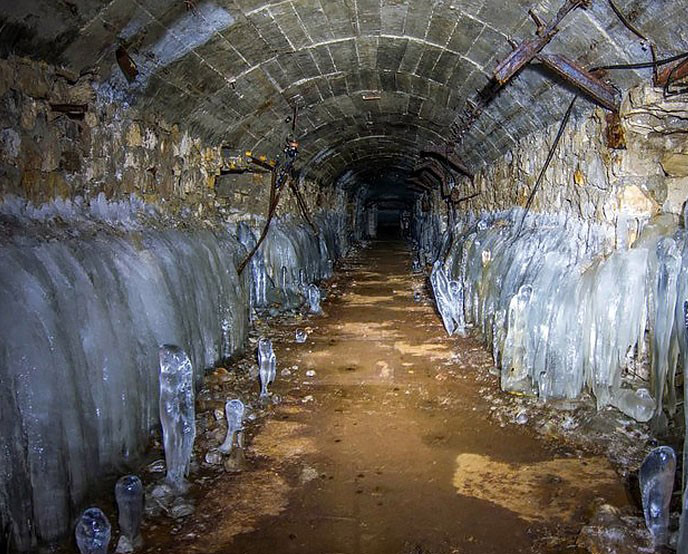
Former governmental storage at suburbs of Samara

The agency traces its history to the 15th century when the Tsar ordered government offices to hold reserves for the public. By the 17th century, reserves of money and bread were created for the case of war. Pyotr I established the office of control (Russian: Провиантский приказ). During Soviet period, On 17 October 1931, by order of the Council of People's Commissars of the Soviet Union a special body established to manage the reserves of the Soviet State, Reserves Committee of the Council of Labor and Defense (Russian: Комитет резервов при Совете Труда и Обороны). All supply reserves were located in various institutions and establishments, as well as state fundraisers that were previously controlled by the People's Procurement Commission, which were transferred to the management committee.

On March 4, 1938, in accordance with the order of the Government the Soviet Union, a reserve system was organized and subordinated to the Council of People's Commissars of the Soviet Union (Russian: Управления государственных резервов при Совете Народных Комиссаров СССР).

In 1939, the State Reserve System received its own scientific center for the development of long-term goods and materials storage technologies - the Central Research Laboratory, which later became the Institute for Storage Problems.

Speaking about the role of state reserves at the start of World War II, Marshal Georgy Zhukov stated that state reserves were created to militarily maintain the economy and provide soldiers until the economy was fully operational for war purposes. Although modest, they helped the national economy, despite the difficulties of 1941, quickly keep pace and the scale needed for a successful war.

Since the late 1930s, vaults and warehouses have been built around the country. The largest warehouse, with natural cold, was the quarry in Sokolia Gori, in the suburbs of Samara. The warehouses were reinforced, pipes were placed in underground halls through which a cooling system was passed. Refrigeration warehouses are located in mines 300–400 meters above the ground. The total product storage capacity at the same time was 16,400 tons. In the 1990s, with the dissolution of the Soviet Union and transformation to market economy, the facility was privatized and lost its importance. Currently, there is only one refrigeration warehouse (18 °C) and some cells with natural cold (-3 °C).

Between 1941 and 1945, about 20 million tons of bread, about 3 million tons of food, about 2 million tons of metals, coal - 16 million tons, petroleum products - 9 million tons, wood - 6 million cubic cubes were released from the state reserve The army and the economy. A significant portion of the products and materials supplied by the Allied Powers also moved through the bases of state reserves, from where they were distributed to the military or the defense industry.

The state reserve system was entrusted with the most important task of ensuring the elimination of the food voucher distribution system. By the end of 1947, mobile divisions were set up among office workers, traveling to the districts to ensure simultaneous release of accumulated goods across the country. On January 1, 1948, the government abolished the voucher system, only from that day onwards the reserve system and the government reserve went from war to peaceful work in peace.

The beginning of the Cold War gave rise to the creation of unprecedented volumes, but these reserves were not only used for military purposes. State reserves were used to eliminate the earthquake effects in Tashkent (1967) and Spitak (1988). In 1986, thousands of tons of lead for the construction of a sarcophagus over the Chernobyl nuclear power plant were moved from special storage facilities in the country quickly. In 1990, work began on the state reserve system for the establishment of a special fund of goods and materials intended to take precautionary measures in response to emergency and humanitarian assistance.

In the early 1990s, the United States' system of the USSR state reserve was split. Substantial objects and assets in the territory of the former Soviet republics have been transferred to the jurisdiction of the new governments. By order of the Russian President of November 25, 1991, the State Reserve Committee under the Russian Government was established. The committee, renamed the "Russian Federation of State Reserves" in 1992, was entrusted with the management of the collection operations and the management of state inventory and food stores in Russia.

In the 1990s, the state reserve system made a significant contribution to maintaining socio-political stability: up to 50 percent of the monthly consumption of products in certain subsidized areas was provided by the State Reserve Commission.

On November 23, 1994, the federal law "On the State Material Reserve" was adopted, which laid down general principles for its establishment and use of the state material reserve. The law introduced a new direction for the use of state reserves (in addition to providing emergency response and providing support in the event of disruptions in food supplies and raw materials) - which gave the committee regulatory influence on the market.

On May 25, 1999, under a presidential decree signed by President Boris Yeltsin, the State Committee for State Reserves became the Russian State Reserves Agency. In March 2004, as part of the federal reform initiated by President Vladimir Putin, the agency was renamed the Federal State Reserve Agency (Rosrezerv) and transferred to the Ministry of Development and Trade.

On December 28, 2010, amendments to the federal law "On State Material Reserves" were adopted and expanded the agency's powers.

On 28 August 2024, as part of a campaign to alleviate the 2022 Russian invasion of Ukraine, the FASR fuel storage facility near Kamensk-Shakhtinsky was set ablaze. This followed closely upon the multi-day blaze at the Proletarsk tank farm.

== Leadership ==
As of April 2024, the head of the FASR was Dmitry Gogin.

== See also ==
- State of emergency in Russia
- Martial law in Russia
- Russian System of Disaster Management
- Emergency medical services in Russia
- Main Directorate of Special Programs of the President of the Russian Federation
