= Martial law in Russia =

Legal status

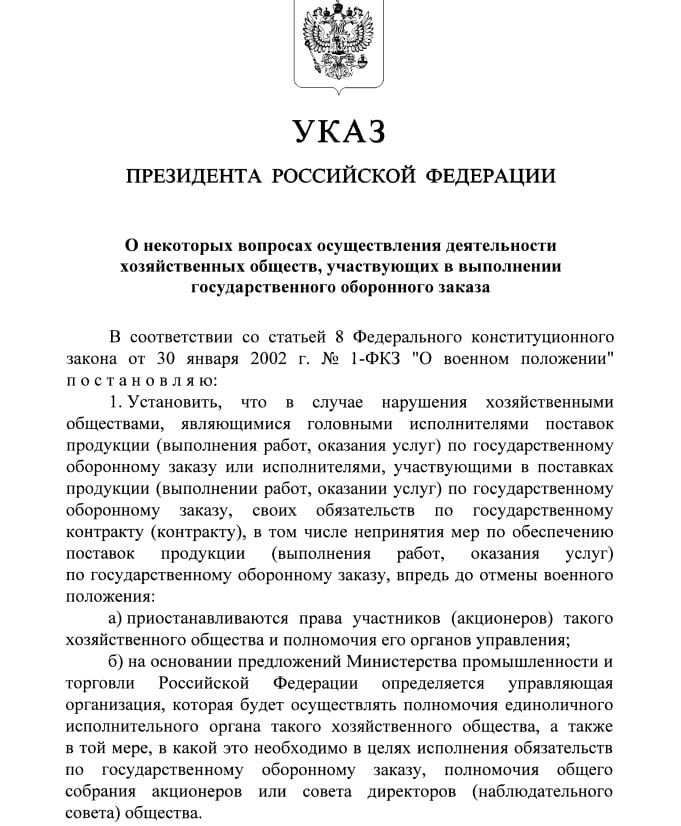
Decree of the President of the Russian Federation regarding "general martial law", March 2023

Martial law in Russia (Russian: Военное положение в России) is defined in Russian law as a special legal regime that is introduced in conditions of external aggression or a threat of such. In this way, it differs from the state of emergency, which is introduced in the event of an internal threat such as an attempted coup, unrest or disaster. Martial law should also be distinguished from the State of War- a term that refers to the period between the outbreak of hostilities and their end. The procedure for introducing and abolishing martial law in Russia is defined in the federal constitutional law “On Martial Law” (2002). In modern Russia, martial law was introduced on 19 October 2022 during the 2022 Russian invasion of Ukraine in the annexed regions of Ukraine, which by then were unilaterally declared by the whole state apparatus to be new federal subjects of Russia.

== History ==
Russian law distinguished between martial law and the state of protection, enhanced or emergency. In the legal literature of the Russian Empire (also the USSR in the 1920s) martial law was often defined through the police concept of “protection”, which was considered in the context of public administration as the protection of public order.

In the Russian Empire, martial law was declared in wartime in the border areas of the state adjacent to the theater of war. In peacetime, provinces or cities that were outraged by the government’s order or in which special strict measures were deemed necessary to maintain order could be declared in the same position. Example: the Kingdom of Poland in 1905, Sumy County (Kharkov Oblast).

In the Soviet Union, martial law could be declared, in accordance with paragraph “t” of article 49 of the Constitution, only the Presidium of the Supreme Soviet of the USSR as stated in the article “in the interests of the defense of the USSR or the maintenance of public order and state security”. In accordance with this, when declaring martial law, all the functions of state authorities on defense, ensuring public order and state security passed to the military command and control bodies — military councils and command of the USSR Armed Forces.

Martial law during the years of the Great Patriotic War in 1941–1945 was successively declared, on the basis of Article 49 of paragraph "p" of the Constitution of the USSR, by decrees of the Presidium of the Supreme Soviet of the USSR and was not canceled until the end of the war with:

- June 22, 1941, in Moscow, Leningrad and most oblasts, territories, republics of the European part of the USSR;
- August 1942, in some cities of Transcaucasia, on the Black Sea and Caspian coasts;
- September 1942, in the Georgian SSR, Azerbaijan SSR and Armenian SSR;
- April 1943, on all railways of the USSR;
- May 1943, by sea and river transport.

In the Russian Federation, martial law was declared on October 19, 2022 in Krasnodar, Belgorod, Bryansk, Voronezh, Kursk and Rostov provinces, because of several attacks in these provinces during the Russo-Ukrainian War following the 2022 Russian invasion of Ukraine.

== Introduction and cancellation ==
Martial law in Russia or in certain localities is introduced by presidential decree, which should be immediately promulgated by radio and television and officially published. In addition, the president must immediately report martial law to the Federation Council and the State Duma. The Federation Council within 48 hours decides whether to approve a presidential decree – and if the decree is not approved, it loses force. The basis for the introduction of martial law is considered aggression against Russia or its immediate threat. The law refers to aggression:

- Invasion of foreign troops or the attack of foreign troops on the Russian, wherever they are;
- Bombardment by foreign troops or other use of weapons against Russia;
- Sending by foreign states of aggressive armed groups to Russia;
- Blockade of Russian ports or coasts by foreign troops;
- Permission of a foreign state to use its territory to attack Russia.
- The law considers the actions of a foreign state in violation of international law, which directly indicate preparation for aggression, to be a direct threat of aggression. As an example, the law cites the declaration of war.

The introduction of martial law also involves the mobilization and organization of territorial defense. After repelling aggression or eliminating its threat, martial law is canceled.

== Permitted limitations ==
The law provides for two groups of restrictions that can be introduced in conditions of martial law (and, if necessary, before it). Elections of the President of Russia cannot be held during the period of martial law.

=== Restrictions in the zone of martial law ===
Restrictions:

- special operation of critical infrastructure and hazardous facilities;
- Evacuation of important objects and people;
- Strengthening the protection of public order, critical infrastructure and other important facilities;
- Restriction of entry, exit and freedom of movement, search, restriction of choice of place of residence;
- Curfew;
- Military censorship in the field of communications;
- Increased secrecy in state and local authorities;
- Restriction of the sale of weapons, dangerous substances, drugs, drugs and alcohol, their temporary withdrawal from citizens;
- Ban on rallies and strikes;
- Prohibition of public, international or foreign organizations that undermine the country's security;
- Forced labor for defense needs, to restore destroyed facilities and fight fires and epidemics;
- Seizure of private property with subsequent compensation;
- Internment of unreliable citizens and citizens of aggressor countries (applies only directly in case of aggression and in order to prevent riots).

=== General restrictions ===
General restrictions that may be imposed even where martial law does not apply:

- Restriction of economic activity, including property turnover;
- Restriction of search and distribution of information;
- Change of ownership of organizations;
- Change in working hours. The abolition of the system of voluntary employment and the introduction of conscription labor obligation (mandatory for all citizens over 14 years old);

Regardless of the context of the circumstances, any information transmitted using means of communication and mass communication can be defined as dual-use information (the level of detail of the content is determined by the military censorship authorities). Such an act, usually not prosecuted in peacetime, but committed under the current regime of martial law, can be considered a reason for accusation of unintentional high treason (if this did not provoke serious consequences, then such an act is recognized as an attempt).

The 2022 Russian invasion of Ukraine prompted the new Russian 2022 war censorship laws. These laws establish administrative (Law No.31-FZ, Law No.62-FZ) and criminal (Law No.32-FZ, Law No.63-FZ) punishments for the dissemination of "unreliable information" about the Russian Armed Forces and other Russian state bodies and their operations, prohibit "discrediting" the Russian military and other Russian state bodies, and prohibit calls for sanctions against Russia.

== Order management ==
With the introduction of martial law, elections and referendum are not held, and the powers of elected bodies of power, local authorities and officials are automatically extended.

The main powers to ensure martial law are concentrated in the hands of the Russian President. The Government of Russia carries out mainly technical functions, in addition, during the period of martial law, the president can change its structure. Russian Parliament passes laws necessary to ensure martial law and moves treaties with aggressor states. The judicial system and the prosecutor's office in the conditions of martial law operate in the same form, the creation of emergency courts in Russia is prohibited. If martial law is established on a part of the territory of Russia, there may be introduced a military department responsible for applying the restrictions.

== See also ==
- State of emergency in Russia
- Russian System of Disaster Management
- Emergency medical services in Russia
- Main Directorate of Special Programs of the President of the Russian Federation
- Federal Agency for State Reserves (Russia)
- Freedom of assembly in Russia
