= Main Directorate of Special Programs of the President of the Russian Federation =

Russian federal government agency

- Главное управление специальных программ Президента Российской Федерации
- Departmental emblem

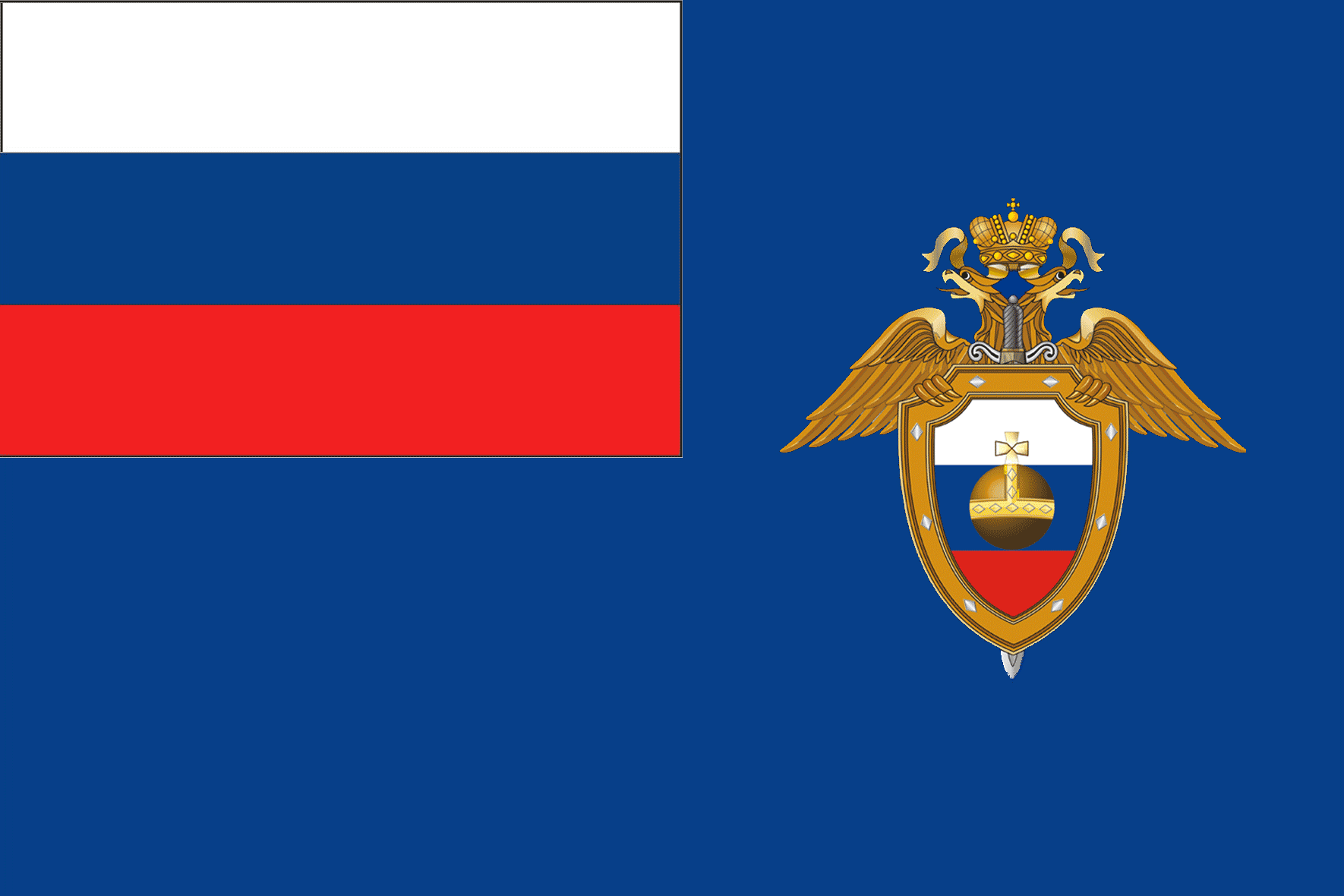
- Official flag

Agency overview
- Formed: 5 January 1994
- Preceding agencies: Fifth Department of the Department of Affairs of the Council of Ministers of the RSFSR (1977-1991); 15th Directorate of the State Security Committee (1977-1991); Fifth Department of the Administration of the President of the RSFSR (1991-1992); Directorate for Planning and Implementing of Special Programs of the Administration of the President of the Russian Federation (1992-1994)
- Jurisdiction: President of Russia
- Headquarters: Moscow, Russia
- Minister responsible: Alexander Leonidovich Linets
- Child agency: Four sub departments and the independent service of special facilities under the President of the Russian Federation
- Website: www.gusp.gov.ru

The Main Directorate of Special Programs of the President of the Russian Federation (Russian: Главное управление специальных программ Президента Российской Федерации; GUSP ГУСП) is a federal executive agency that performs functions to ensure the fulfillment of the authority of the President of the Russian Federation in the field of mobilization training and mobilization in the Russian Federation. The scope of their competence is described in the Federal Law "On Mobilization Preparation and Mobilization in the Russian Federation."

== History ==
Originally established on January 6, 1977, as the Fifth Department of the Department of Affairs of the Council of Ministers of the Russian Soviet Federative Socialist Republic (RSFSR) by the decision of the Council of Ministers of the RSFSR.

The main task entrusted to the Fifth Directorate was to act as the customer in the construction of new structures, in the modernization and reconstruction of existing government structures (buildings and sites) of the Council of Ministers of the RSFSR, in keeping them in constant readiness for immediate use, and in coordinating the activities of ministries and departments to keep existing control points (sites) and oversee construction of new spare control points of the Russian Federation, as well as the methodological guidance on the issues of maintaining the readiness of reserve control posts in the RSFSR. In addition, since 1991, the Fifth Directorate has been entrusted with the functional responsibilities of organizing and providing mobilization training for the Department of Affairs of the Council of Ministers of the RSFSR, and since January 1992, the Administration of the President and the Government of the Russian Federation.

By the Decree of the President of the Russian Federation of August 5, 1991, No. 32, the Fifth Department was incorporated into the Administration of the President of the RSFSR, and since September 24, 1992, by the President of the RSFSR, it has been transformed into the Directorate for Planning and Implementing Special Programs of the Administration of the President of the Russian Federation.

By the Decree of the President of the Russian Federation of January 5, 1994, the Office of Planning and Implementation of Special Programs of the Administration of the President of the Russian Federation was transformed into the Main Directorate for Special Programs of the President of the Russian Federation. This new state agency united not only the units that provide the preparation of a documented mobilization base, but also a system of special facilities. The Main Directorate, as a structural unit, was included in the Administration of the President of the Russian Federation.

In accordance with the Decree of the President of the Russian Federation of April 30, 1998, No. 483 "On the Structure of the Federal Executive Bodies," the Main Directorate was assigned to federal executive bodies, whose activities are directly managed by the President of the Russian Federation.

In accordance with Article 32 of the Federal Constitutional Law of December 17 1997 No. 2-FKZ "On the Government of the Russian Federation" Presidential Decree No. 1146 of September 7, 2004 "Questions of the Main Directorate for Special Programs of the President of the Russian Federation" approved the Regulations on the Main Directorate.

== Responsibilities ==
Under the leadership of presidential appointee Alexander Leonidovich Linets since April 7, 2015, the GUSP is responsible for:

- Bringing to the President of the Russian Federation and the Government of the Russian Federation drafts of normative acts on issues related to the agency's established field of activity;
- Preparing for the President of the Russian Federation an annual consolidated report on the state of mobilization readiness of the Russian Federation;
- Independently exercising legal regulation on issues related to the agency's established field of activity, with the exception of issues whose legal regulation is regulated by other federal bodies;
- Developing measures to ensure state bodies and the Presidential Administration of the Russian Federation continue to function in wartime conditions, ensuring coordinated functioning and interaction of state bodies in the field of mobilization training and mobilization;
- Providing methodological support for mobilization training and mobilization of state bodies, for the development and distribution of necessary methodological documents, conducting mobilization exercises and training;
- Organizing the development and maintenance of mobilization documents of the President of the Russian Federation and the Administration of the President of the Russian Federation;
- Ensuring the readiness of the notification system of state bodies, the proper functioning of the warning center of the Presidential Administration of the Russian Federation, as well as methodological support and technical readiness of the notification system of the RF Government Staff;
- Organizing and maintaining the readiness of special facilities for immediate emergency use, their reconstruction and technical re-equipment, as well as the construction of new facilities;
- Ensuring the activities of state bodies in the process of functioning of their reserve (emergency/wartime) control posts;
- Organizing in accordance with the established procedures, military registration for the period of mobilization and wartime for employees of the highest state authorities;
- Carrying out the tenders and the conclusion of state contracts for the placement of orders for the supply of goods, the performance of work, the provision of services, as well as for carrying out research, development and technological work for state requirements in the agency's established field of activity;
- Carrying out the powers of the owner in relation to federal property necessary to ensure the performance of its own functions;
- Providing its own mobilization training;
- Providing staffing;
- Establishing the procedures for working with classified GUSP documents, carrying out, in accordance with the legislation of the Russian Federation, the acquisition, storage, accounting and use of archival documents;
- Carrying out the functions of the main administrator of the federal funds provided for the maintenance of the GUSP and the implementation of the functions assigned to it, etc.

== Agency leadership ==
- Vasily Alekseevich Frolov (1994–1998)
- Viktor Mikhailovich Zorin (1998–2000)
- Alexander Vasilyevich Tsarenko (2000 – October 31, 2011)
- Dmitry Alekseevich Ryzhkov (October 31, 2011 – March 10, 2014)
- Vladislav Vladimirovich Menshchikov (March 18, 2014 – April 7, 2015)
- Alexander Leonidovich Linets (since April 7, 2015)

== See also ==
- Martial law in Russia
- State of emergency in Russia
- Federal Agency for State Reserves
- Awards of the GUSP
- Mount Yamantau
