= Russian annexation of Donetsk, Kherson, Luhansk and Zaporizhzhia oblasts =

2022 annexation of areas in Ukraine

Russian annexation of Donetsk, Kherson, Luhansk, and Zaporizhzhia Oblasts
- Part of the ongoing invasion of Ukraine and the Russo-Ukrainian War
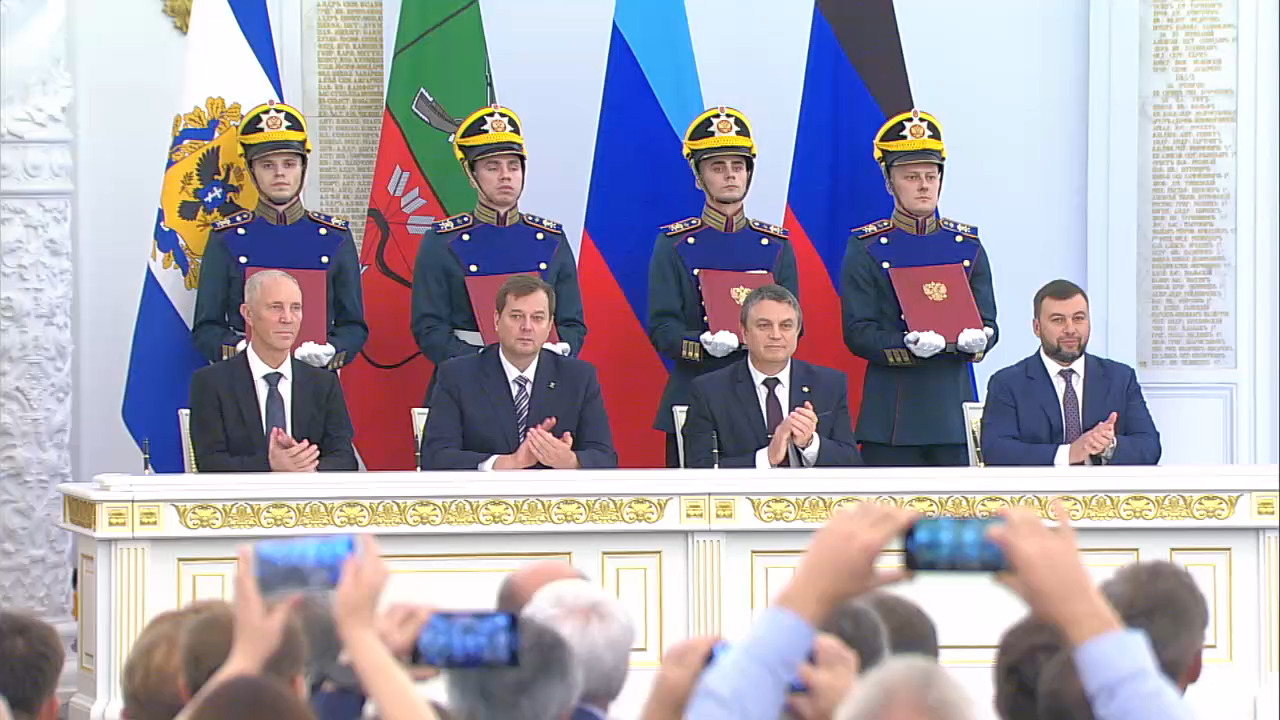
- Russian-installed officials at the annexation ceremony in Moscow
- Date: 30 September 2022; 4 years ago
- Location: Southern and Eastern Ukraine
- Organised by: Russia
- Outcome: Declared annexation of an undefined area in and around Donetsk, Kherson, Luhansk, and Zaporizhzhia oblasts by the Russian Federation, including a part of Mykolaiv Oblast; 143 members of the United Nations condemn the annexation and declare it illegal under international law; Ukraine applies for NATO membership

On 30 September 2022, Russia, amid an ongoing invasion of Ukraine, unilaterally declared its annexation of areas in and around four Ukrainian oblasts—Donetsk, Kherson, Luhansk, and Zaporizhzhia. Most of Luhansk Oblast and part of Donetsk Oblast had been controlled by pro-Russian separatists since 2014, while the Kherson and Zaporizhzhia Oblasts were invaded by Russia in 2022. The boundaries of the areas to be annexed and their borders were not defined; Russian officials stated that they would be defined later. None of the oblasts were fully under Russian control at the time of the declaration, nor since. If limited to the areas then under Russian control (about 90,000 km^{2} or 15% of Ukraine's territory, roughly the size of Portugal) the annexation would still be the largest in Europe since World War II.

The move occurred after internationally unrecognized referendums held days prior, which were organized by Russian occupation authorities in territories where hostilities were ongoing and much of the population had fled. It occurred seven months after the start of the invasion and less than a month after the start of the Ukrainian Kharkiv counteroffensive. The signing ceremony was held in the Grand Kremlin Palace in Moscow in the presence of occupation authority heads Leonid Pasechnik, Denis Pushilin, Yevgeny Balitsky and Vladimir Saldo, and Russian president Vladimir Putin.

The declared annexation is unrecognized by the international community, with the exception of North Korea and, formerly, also Ba'athist Syria. Ukraine, the European Union, the United States and the United Nations all said that the referendums and the annexation had no legal basis or effect. Ukrainian President Volodymyr Zelenskyy said in response that Ukraine would apply for accession into NATO on an expedited basis. On 19 October Russia introduced martial law within the annexed and controlled areas, with legislation allowing for bans on public gatherings and other widespread restrictions on personal liberty.

The Ukrainian Kherson and Kharkiv counteroffensives allowed Ukraine to recapture parts of its territory, including Kherson on 11 November 2022.

== Background ==
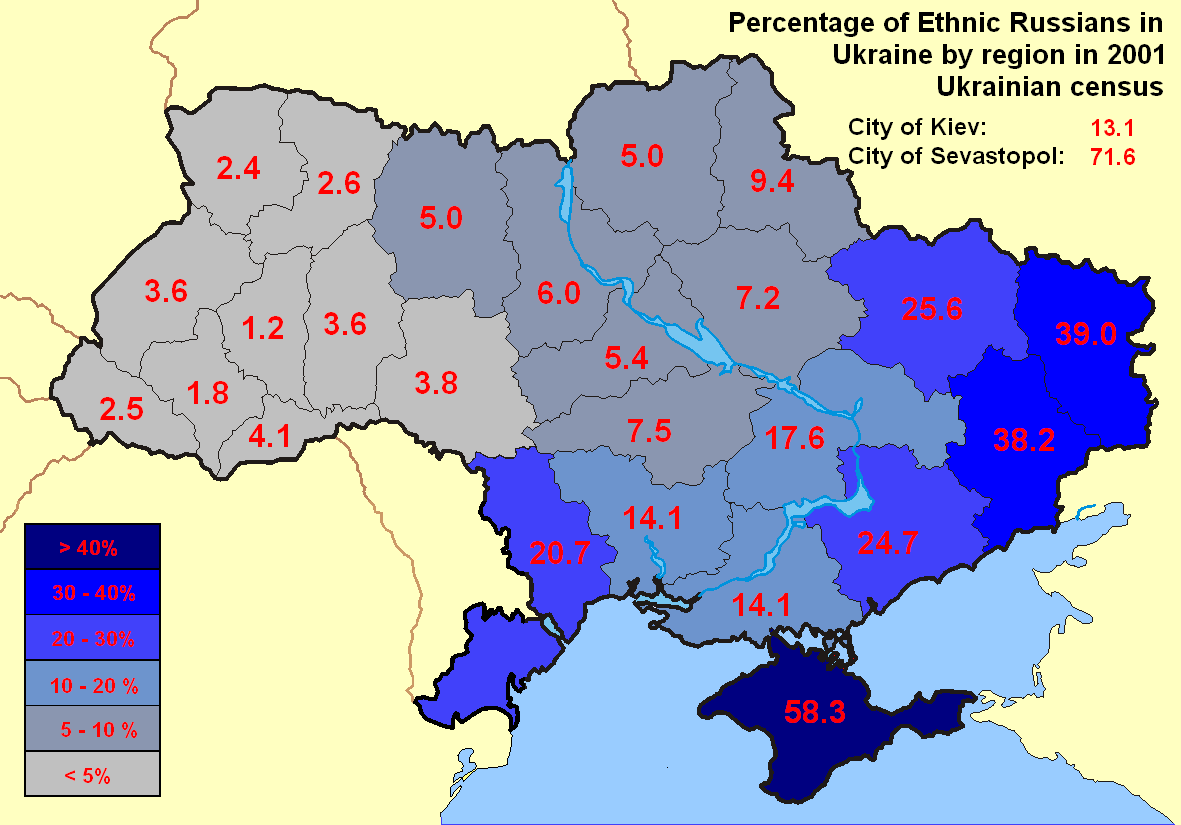
Ethnic Russians by region (Census 2001). Russia used the "protection" of ethnic Russians and Russian speakers in Ukraine as one of the pretexts for the invasion and occupation.

Vast regions to the north of the Black Sea were sparsely populated and were known as the Wild Fields (as translated from Polish or Ukrainian). In the 15th century, the entire area of the northern coast of the Black Sea came under the control of the Crimean Khanate, which became a vassal of the Ottoman Empire. The Russian Empire gradually gained control over the area in the 18th century, signing peace treaties with the Cossack Hetmanate and with the Ottoman Empire after the Russo-Turkish Wars. The name Novorossiya entered official usage in 1764. It was further expanded by annexing the Ukrainian Cossack Zaporozhian Sich in 1775.

The four oblasts in southern and eastern Ukraine originated from Yekaterinoslav, Kherson, Taurida and Kharkov Governorates and Don Host Oblast of the Russian Empire. They were reorganized over the years during Communist rule when Ukraine was part of the Soviet Union. The boundaries remained static after Ukraine became independent in 1991. All four regions overwhelmingly voted in favour of Ukrainian independence during the 1991 Ukrainian independence referendum.

In February and March 2014, following the revolution in Ukraine, Russia occupied and subsequently annexed Crimea from Ukraine by way of holding a referendum. The annexation was mostly internationally unrecognized and was condemned by the UN General Assembly. In April 2014, pro-Russian separatists in eastern Ukraine proclaimed the independence of the Donetsk People's Republic (in Ukraine's Donetsk Oblast) and the Luhansk People's Republic (in Ukraine's Luhansk Oblast) with unofficial support from Russia.

On 21 February 2022, Russia officially recognized the Donetsk People's Republic and the Luhansk People's Republic and, three days later, started a full-scale invasion of Ukraine, during which they occupied territory in the Kherson and Zaporizhzhia Oblasts, with formal military occupations beginning in the first week. On 23 February, Putin in a televised address announced a "special military operation" in Ukraine, launching a full-scale invasion of Ukraine. In his speech, Putin claimed that Russia has no plans to occupy Ukrainian territory, adding: "We are not going to impose anything on anyone by force".

== Annexation referendums ==
On 20 September, the authorities of the Donetsk People's Republic, the Luhansk People's Republic, as well as the occupation regimes of Kherson Oblast and Zaporizhzhia Oblast, announced referendums on joining Russia on 23–27 September.

On 27 September, Russian officials claimed that the accession "referendum" in Zaporizhzhia Oblast passed, with 93.11% of voters in favor of joining Russia.

== Proclamations of independence of Kherson and Zaporizhzhia ==
Russian Presidential decrees No. 685 (left) and No. 686 (right), recognizing the independence of Zaporizhzhia and Kherson oblasts.

Following the annexation referendums in Kherson and Zaporizhzhia oblasts, the Russian military-civilian administrations of Kherson and Zaporizhzhia proclaimed independence as an intermediate step for Russian annexation. The day after the referendums were held, the KMCA proclaimed the independence of the 'Kherson region'. The ZMCA did the same for Zaporizhzhia, proclaiming independence for the 'Zaporozhye region'.

On 29 September, Russia recognized Kherson and Zaporizhzhia regions as independent countries, hours before annexing them.

== Annexation proceedings and borders ==
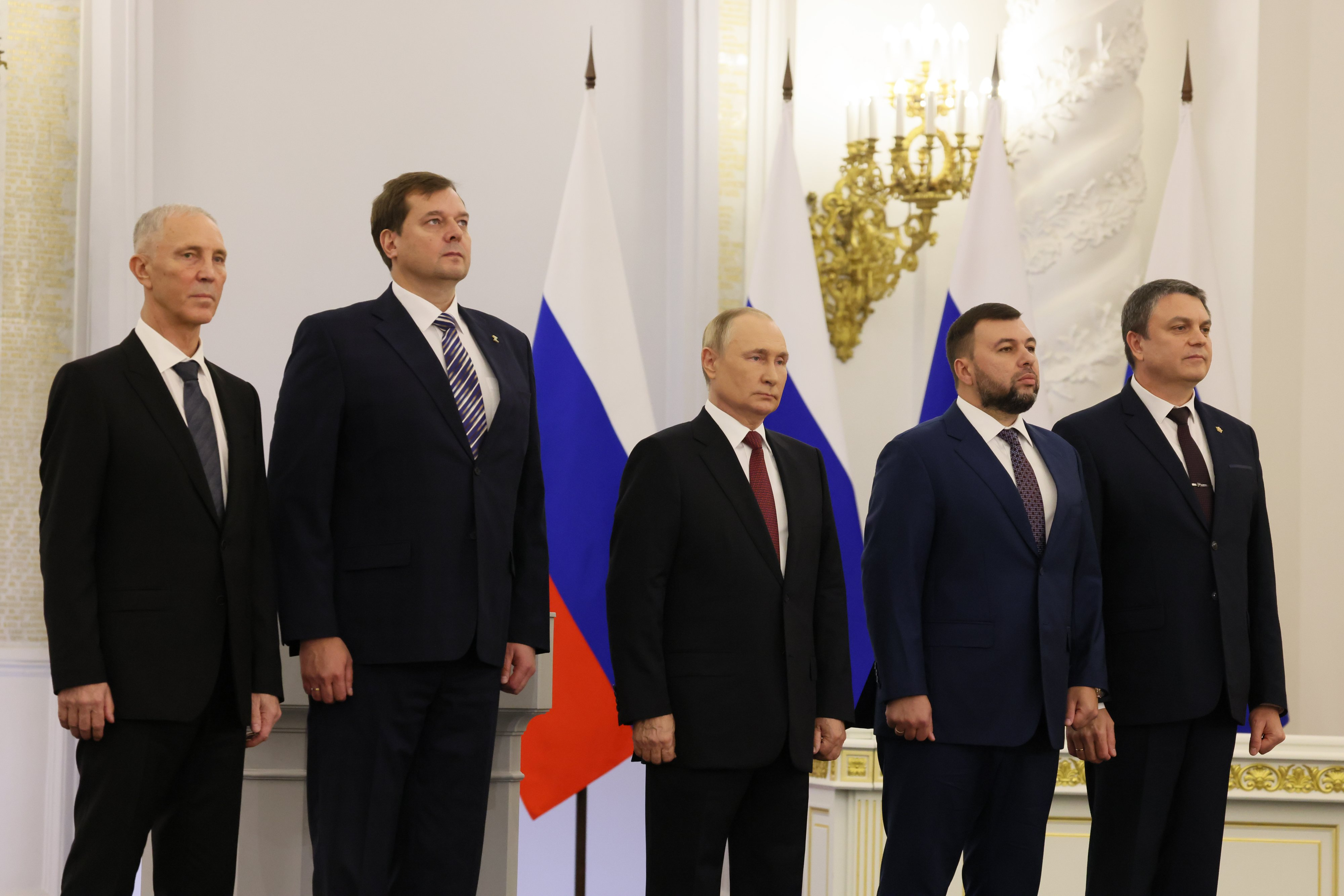
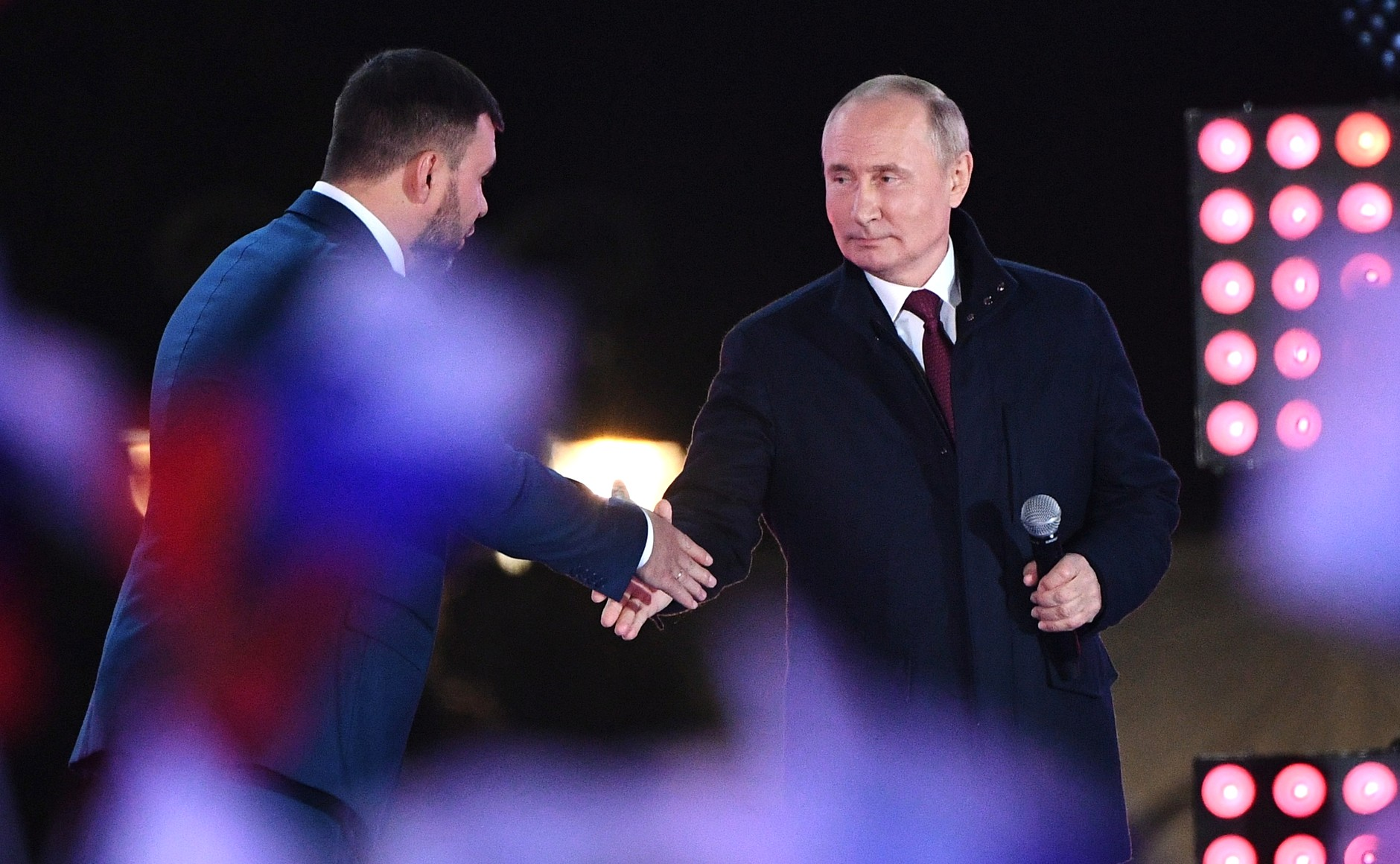
Vladimir Putin with pro-Russian leaders of the regions on 30 September 2022 (left).
Putin and Denis Pushilin at the "People's Choice. Together Forever" concert (right), a state-held rally held after the annexation.

Ukrainian regions wholly or largely claimed by Russia since 2014 (Crimea) and 2022 (others). Parts of Mykolaiv Oblast claimed to have been annexed into Kherson Oblast are included; part of Kharkiv Oblast under Russian control at the time are not included.

On 30 September, Putin signed accession treaties with the four pro-Russian leaders of the regions, Leonid Pasechnik, Head of the Luhansk People's Republic; Denis Pushilin, Head of the Donetsk People's Republic; Yevgeny Balitsky, governor of the Zaporizhzhia Oblast; and Volodymyr Saldo, governor of the Kherson Oblast. The exact boundaries of the territories declared annexed were, however, not legally defined, with the drafts of final annexation documents recursively referring to territories "on the day of the admission to the Russian Federation" and on the day of "the formation of a new constituent entity within the Russian Federation", both being prospective future events.

Hours after the declared annexation, the Ukrainian army recaptured several towns in Donetsk Oblast as part of the 2022 Ukrainian Kharkiv counteroffensive.

At the time of the annexation proceedings in early October, Russian authorities stated that the Luhansk People's Republic and Donetsk People's Republic (collectively called the Donbas) would maintain their 2014 borders. They also stated that elsewhere, the new Russian border was not clearly defined, and would be defined in consultation with local residents. It was also stated that Russian-held parts of Mykolaiv Oblast would be incorporated into Russian-controlled Kherson Oblast.

Russia did not hold the entirety of the Donetsk, Luhansk, Kherson and Zaporizhzhia Oblasts; at the time, it held about 60% of Donetsk Oblast, most of Luhansk Oblast, almost all of Kherson Oblast, and about 70% of Zaporizhzhia Oblast. It held almost none of Mykolaiv Oblast, and had recently lost all but a small part of the areas it had controlled in Kharkiv Oblast; Ukrainian intelligence claimed to have obtained documents indicating that a planned annexation referendum in Kharkiv Oblast was cancelled as a result of these losses.

It was not clear whether Russia was claiming those portions of the named oblasts which it does not hold under military control. Russian authorities did state that all of the Donetsk region would be treated as part of Russia, and that the portion not under Russian control would be "liberated". The areas which were controlled by Russia at the time (Note: Taking oblast areas, in thousands of km^{2}, from the Wikipedia articles on the respective oblasts, and the rough percentage of each oblast held, as described in this section, 0.7*27.183+28.461+0.6*26.517+26.684=90.083 thousand square kilometers) amount to about 15% of Ukraine's total area, more than 90,000 km^{2} (35,000 sq mi)—roughly the size of Hungary or Portugal.

On 3 October, Putin's spokesperson Dmitry Peskov stated that the Donetsk and Luhansk people's republics will be annexed in "their 2014 borders", while as for the Zaporizhzhia and Kherson oblasts Russia will "continue consultations with the residents as to their borders". These comments caused confusion and polemics among supporters of the annexation in Russia, with former Ukrainian parliamentarian and Russian collaborator Oleg Tsaryov arguing "there is no 2014 borders" of DNR and LNR.

Russia's State Duma unanimously rubber stamped the annexations on 3 October. The annexation of each oblast received more "yes" votes than there were lawmakers present. Chairman Vyacheslav Volodin blamed the discrepancies on a "technical failure". The Federation Council approved the annexations not long afterwards and President Putin signed them into law. The annexation was carried out also in violation of Russian law.

== Consequences ==
Regions of Ukraine annexed by Russia in 2014 and 2022, with a red line marking the area of actual control by Russia on 30 September 2022

On 1 October, Russia began requiring Ukrainians wishing to cross into Ukrainian-held areas to fill out exit visas and get permission in advance. The number of people arriving from areas of Russian control slowed to a trickle, with talk of a "new Iron Curtain". Getting permission to leave can take up to two weeks and requires clearances from various Russian security agencies.

On 19 October, President Vladimir Putin declared martial law in the annexed areas.

Newsweek reported in September 2022 that some estimates suggest that the reconstruction of the annexed territories would cost Russia between $100 and $200 billion. A state budget published on 29 September by the Kremlin revealed that 3.3 billion roubles (about US$59 million) had been set aside to rebuild the regions.

In December 2022, Peskov said that any peace plans to end the Russo-Ukrainian War can only proceed from Ukraine's recognition of Russia's annexation of occupied regions in September 2022. In January 2023, Putin cited recognition of Russia's sovereignty over the annexed territories as a condition for peace talks with Ukraine.

In July 2024, Chief of the General Staff of the British Army Roland Walker said that with the current way of fighting, it would take Russia five years to fully control the four annexed regions, and it would cost Russia more than 1.5 million casualties. He said there were "no winners" in Russia's invasion of Ukraine, adding that "it is an utter devastation for both sides and lost generations."

In March 2026, it was reported that the Russian government planned to relocate 114,000 Russian citizens into the annexed territory by 2045 in an act of settler colonialism, and that Russia plans to make significant infrastructure and tourism investments for the annexed territories.

== Speech by Putin ==
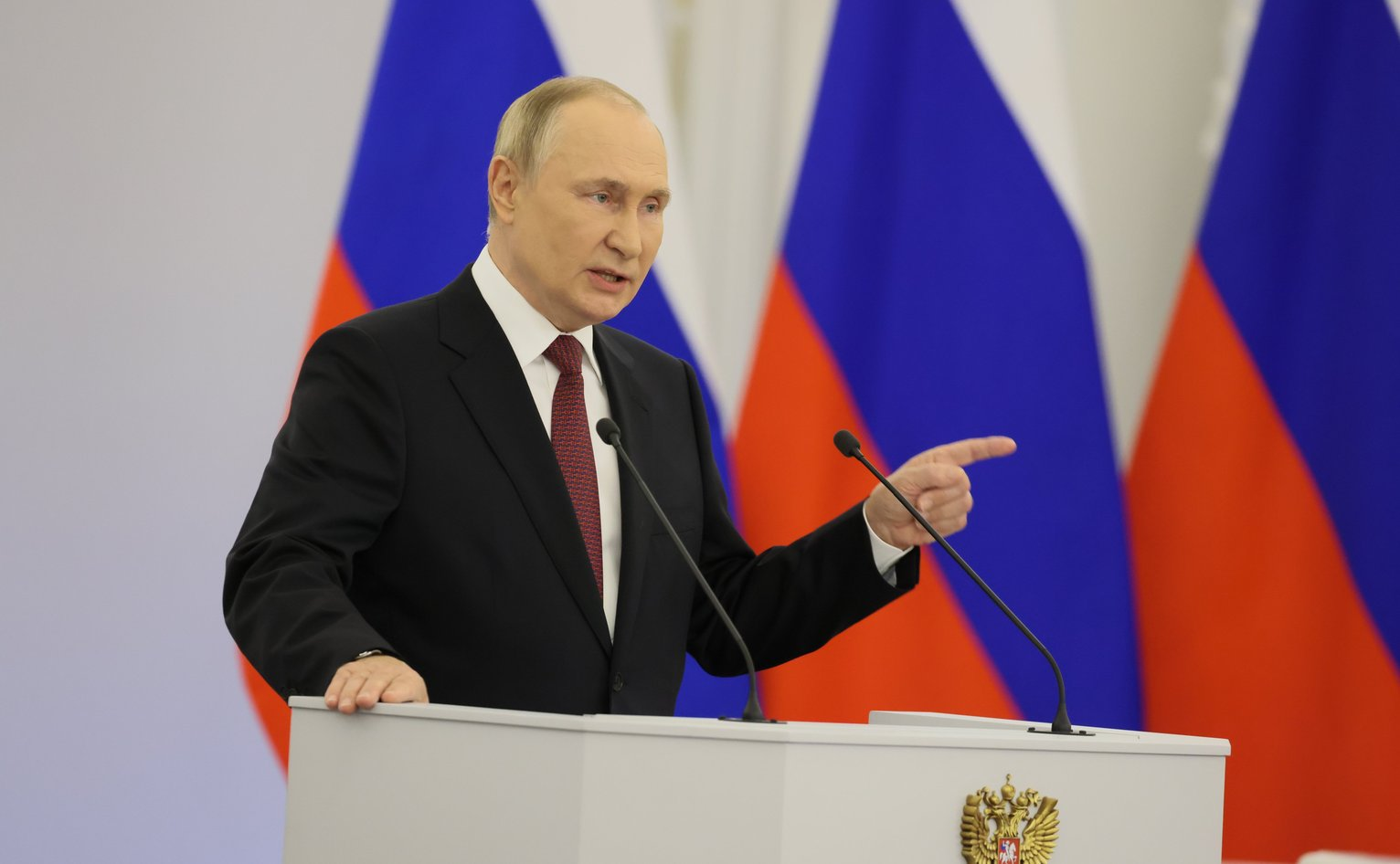
Vladimir Putin during the speech

Russian president Vladimir Putin delivered a 37-minute-long speech to both chambers of the Russian parliament about the annexation of Donetsk, Kherson, Luhansk and Zaporizhzhia oblasts into Russia. He spoke in the St. George Hall of the Grand Kremlin Palace in the Moscow Kremlin. The tone of the speech was strongly anti-American and anti-Western, to the point where observers described it as his most anti-Western speech to date.

Following the results of recent referendums on the annexation of occupied territories of Ukraine by Russia—which were condemned as shams by independent observers and the international community—Putin said that it was the "will of millions of people" in these territories to become part of Russia and to become Russian citizens "forever". He cited Article 1 of the UN charter as justification for his claims.

Within the speech, Putin spoke about the colonial past of the Western world, denouncing its "totalitarianism, despotism and apartheid", and accused it of attempting to create a neo-colonial and unipolar world order. He said that the West intended to destroy Russia as a nation, and called "the ruling circles of the so-called West" "the enemy" threatening religion and morality, accusing the West of Satanism.

Putin also blamed the recent Nord Stream gas leaks on the "Anglo-Saxons" and said that the use of nuclear weapons by the US on Hiroshima and Nagasaki "set a precedent".

== Reactions ==
On 12 October 2022, the UN General Assembly adopted Resolution ES 11/4 declaring that the staged referendums and attempted annexation are invalid and illegal under international law. In favour: 143 Against: 5 Abstained: 35 Absent: 10

According to Reuters, if Russia "formally annexed a vast additional chunk of Ukraine, Putin would essentially be daring the United States and its European allies to risk a direct military confrontation", and would certainly escalate the ongoing war between Russia and Ukraine.

The UN's Under Secretary General for Political and Peacebuilding Affairs Rosemary DiCarlo rejected the referendum and said, "Unilateral actions aimed to provide a veneer of legitimacy to the attempted acquisition by force by one State of another State's territory while claiming to represent the will of the people, cannot be regarded as legal under international law".

A United Nations Security Council meeting was held on 30 September 2022, to vote on a resolution to condemn Russia for annexing these territories, resulting in ten yes votes, one no vote, and four abstentions. The resolution failed because Russia vetoed it. Brazil, China, Gabon and India abstained from the vote. (Note: Yes: France, United Kingdom, United States, Albania, Ghana, Ireland, Kenya, Mexico, Norway, United Arab Emirates Abstention: Brazil, China, Gabon, India No: Russia)

On 12 October 2022, the UN General Assembly passed Resolution ES-11/4, titled "Territorial integrity of Ukraine: defending the principles of the Charter of the United Nations", with 143 nations voting in favor, 5 against and 35 abstaining. It condemned the "illegal so-called referendums" and the "attempted illegal annexation" and demanded that Russia immediately reverse its decisions and withdraw its forces from Ukraine.

Only North Korea has recognized the Russian annexation of the four partially occupied regions of Ukraine. Ba'athist Syria also recognized Russia's claims in 2023, but in April 2026 Ukraine's foreign ministry said that the Syrian side had affirmed respect for Ukraine's sovereignty and territorial integrity in the protocol restoring diplomatic relations, thereby cancelling Assad-era recognition decisions concerning Russian occupation administrations in Ukraine.

A YouGov poll showed that in February 2023, 63% of respondents in Sweden wanted to support Ukraine in a war with Russia until Russian troops leave all occupied territories. A Gallup poll conducted in June 2023 found that 62% of respondents in the United States wanted to support Ukraine in regaining territory that Russia had captured, even if it meant prolonging the war between Russia and Ukraine, while 32% wanted to end the war as quickly as possible, even if it meant allowing Russia to keep the territory it conquered in southeastern Ukraine.

On September 9, 2023, the Azerbaijani Ministry of Foreign Affairs issued a statement condemning the "sham 'elections'" held in parts of Ukraine.

=== Ukrainian response ===
On 7 August 2022, the president of Ukraine Volodymyr Zelenskyy said that "if the occupiers proceed along the path of pseudo-referendums they will close for themselves any chance of talks with Ukraine and the free world, which the Russian side will clearly need at some point." Following the annexation ceremony, Zelenskyy declared that Ukraine would not negotiate with Russia "as long as Putin is president", and requested a "fast-track" NATO membership in response.

In the poll conducted by the Kyiv International Institute of Sociology (KIIS) between 13 and 18 May 2022, 82% of Ukrainians said they did not support any territorial concessions to Russia, even if that meant prolonging the war. Another KIIS poll conducted in September 2022 found that 87% of Ukrainians opposed any territorial concessions to Russia.

On 29 September, Mykhailo Podolyak, an advisor to Zelenskyy, said that the Russian plans to annex parts of Ukraine "do not make legal sense" and that the annexation ceremony was a "Kremlin freak show".

The Ukrainian Kherson and Kharkiv counteroffensives allowed Ukraine to recapture parts of its territory, including the city of Kherson on 11 November.

== See also ==
- Russian-occupied territories of Ukraine
- Crimean speech of Vladimir Putin
- Annexation of Crimea by the Russian Federation
- Proposed Russian annexation of Transnistria
- Proposed Russian annexation of South Ossetia
- Collaboration with Russia during the Russian invasion of Ukraine
- Post-Soviet states: "Near abroad"
- Russian-occupied territories
- Russian imperialism
- Russian irredentism
- Novorossiya (confederation)
- Nuclear risk during the Russian invasion of Ukraine

=== Geopolitical aspects ===
- List of military occupations
- List of national border changes (1914–present)
- Timeline of geopolitical changes (2000–present)
- Territorial nationalism
