= 2024 Bashkortostan protests =

Demonstrations in Russia

- Date: 15–19 January 2024 (4 days)
- Location: Bashkortostan, Russia (Baymak and Ufa)
- Caused by: Imprisonment of Fail Alsynov
- Goals: Release of Fail Alsynov; Release of detained protesters; Resignation of Bashkir Head Radiy Khabirov
- Methods: Protests; Demonstrations; Civil disobedience; Online activism
- Result: Temporary blocking of WhatsApp and Telegram in Bashkortostan; Crackdown on protesters

Parties
Bashkir protestors: Supported by: Committee of Bashkir Resistance	Government of Bashkortostan: Bashkir Ministry of Internal Affairs; Government of Russia: National Guard; OMON

Lead figures
Fail Alsynov	Radiy Khabirov; Alexander Pryadko

Casualties and losses
Unknown Several people arrested	Unknown One person killed

The 2024 Bashkortostan protests (Bashkir: Башҡортостанда протесттар, romanized: Bashqortostanda protesttar) are a series of protests started on 15 January 2024 beginning in the Republic of Bashkortostan, Russia, sparked by the authorities initiating a criminal case against the Bashkir environmental activist Fail Alsynov, who was subsequently sentenced to four years in prison. This led to demonstrations in the town of Baymak, where at least 1,000 Bashkir protesters assembled. The protests resulted in clashes with the riot police, who in response deployed tear gas and batons against the protesters. The protests spread into the regional capital of Ufa on 19 January, where 10 people were arrested in response.

Due to the growing protests in Bashkortostan, messaging services WhatsApp and Telegram were allegedly blocked across the region, as messages sent by users from major cities such as Moscow, Kazan, Nizhny Novgorod, and Saint Petersburg failed to deliver. Most of the failed messages were from the city of Ufa, which is estimated to comprise 22% of all messages in the country, according to the data provided by the Downdetector service.

== Background ==
In April 2023, Bashkir environmental activist Fail Alsynov participated in protests in the village of Ishmurzino, Baymaksky District, Bashkortostan, opposing geological exploration work within the Irendik mountain range.

In May 2023, the Head of Bashkortostan, Radiy Khabirov, asked deputies of the local parliament, the Kurultai, to propose an initiative to transfer to Russian regions the authority to issue licenses for the extraction of gold using the alluvial (placer) method. Khabirov said:

For quite a long time we have been concerned about the situation with gold mining in a number of areas of the Trans-Urals using the alluvial method. Residents of the republic and heads of municipalities learn that a license for gold mining has been issued when the first equipment appears. And people are very outraged by this. I propose something that concerns specifically the issuance of licenses for the extraction of gold using the alluvial method, and this is sometimes the most barbaric method of unscrupulous licensees... I ask you to come up with a proposal to transfer these powers to the level of the constituent entities of Russia, in this case, to our republic. Really, I can't say it any other way, I'm tired of it all.

Following Alsynov's public speech to Ishmurzino residents in October 2023, Radiy Khabirov issued a personal statement against Alsynov. Khabirov accused Alsynov of delivering a speech with negative content about the ethnicities of Armenians, Caucasians, and Central Asians during the April 2023 rally organized in defense of the lands of the Bashkir Trans-Urals from mining (migrant workers from outside Bashkortostan were planned to be employed in mining operations, some of which Alysnov believes are illicit). The rally aimed to prevent resource extraction due to negative perceptions of companies and organizers affiliated with the Bashkir government, who faced backlash from local residents.

In early 2024, the prosecutor's office imposed a four-year prison term on Alsynov for "inciting hatred on ethnic grounds". Closed court hearings took place, accompanied by rallies involving thousands of supporters of Alsynov in his defense.

== Protests ==
On 15 January 2024, the town of Baymak hosted the third court hearing, during which the verdict announcement was scheduled for 17 January. Approximately 1,000–5,000 individuals, according to various estimates, attended the trial proceedings to show support for Alsynov.

On 16 January 2024, Alsynov was added to the "list of extremists".

On 17 January 2024, the Baymaksky District Court of Bashkortostan found Alsynov guilty and sentenced him to four years in prison. This decision led to violent skirmishes outside the courthouse, and clashes with security forces persisted for several days. Several protest participants and supporters were detained. Protest estimates suggested a turnout of about 10,000 demonstrators in the relatively populated town of Baymak, which has an approximate population of 17,710 (2010 census);

An unsanctioned rally occurred in Salavat Yulayev Square in the Bashkir capital of Ufa on 19 January 2024. The National Guard and OMON riot police were deployed against a crowd of approximately 2,000 people. The protest took an unusual form, with participants engaging in folk dance, circling, and singing songs in the Bashkir language. A group holding posters that read кара халык (transl. Common Person) was detained early in the rally and forcefully placed into police buses. Rally participants reportedly attempted unsuccessfully to block the road and prevent the police bus carrying detainees from leaving. In total, 10 people were detained.

== Aftermath ==
On 20 January 2024, a picket in support of Alsynov and Bashkir protesters occurred in Khabarovsk. Participants rallied for the release of all political prisoners, including former Khabarovsk Krai governor Sergei Furgal.

== Reactions ==
Radiy Khabirov, the Head of the Republic of Bashkortostan, pledged not to tolerate extremism and any attempts to undermine the situation in the region. He stated, "You can put on the mask of a good environmental activist, a patriot, but in reality the situation is not at all like that. A group of people, some of whom are abroad, essentially being traitors, are calling for the separation of Bashkortostan from Russia. They are calling for guerrilla warfare here. This includes Ruslan Gabbasov." Khabirov also characterized the decision to recognize the political party Bashkort as an extremist organization as the "right decision". Khabirov defended his denunciation of Fail Alsynov, characterizing him and his supporters as separatists acting under foreign influence. State media and several pro-government officials echoed these claims, attributing the unrest to “foreign special services” allegedly operating from Ukraine and the Baltic states, though no evidence was provided.

Kremlin Press Secretary Dmitry Peskov commented on the situation in a press call, rejecting the characterization of mass riots or protests in Bashkortostan. He clarified, "There are some manifestations that are more likely to be exclusively within the competence of local authorities and law enforcement agencies. But I categorically disagree that they are massive."

Russian political scientist Ekaterina Schulmann characterized the police response in Baymak as a type of "administrative dysfunction". She noted that such incidents contribute to regional grievances and could pose risks for the Russian authorities ahead of the 2024 Russian presidential election, especially about ethnic tensions.

Russian-Bashkir rapper Morgenshtern supported the protest. He posted the image of Salawat Yulayev on social networks, who is widely considered a national hero of the republic.

== See also ==
- 2020 Kushtau protests
- Separatism in Russia
- Opposition to Vladimir Putin in Russia
- National Liberation Struggle of the Bashkir People
