= Bashkort Company =

- Рота «Башкорт» (Ukrainian) «Башҡорт» ротаһы (Bashkir)
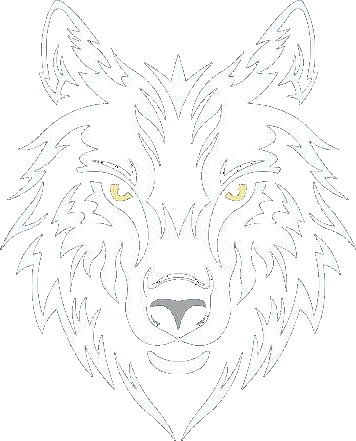
- Active: 2022
- Country: Ukraine
- Allegiance: Ukraine; Bashkortostan; Ministry of Defence of Ukraine
- Branch: Ukrainian Ground Forces
- Type: Company
- Colors: Teal Blue; Green; White
- Engagements: Russian invasion of Ukraine

Insignia
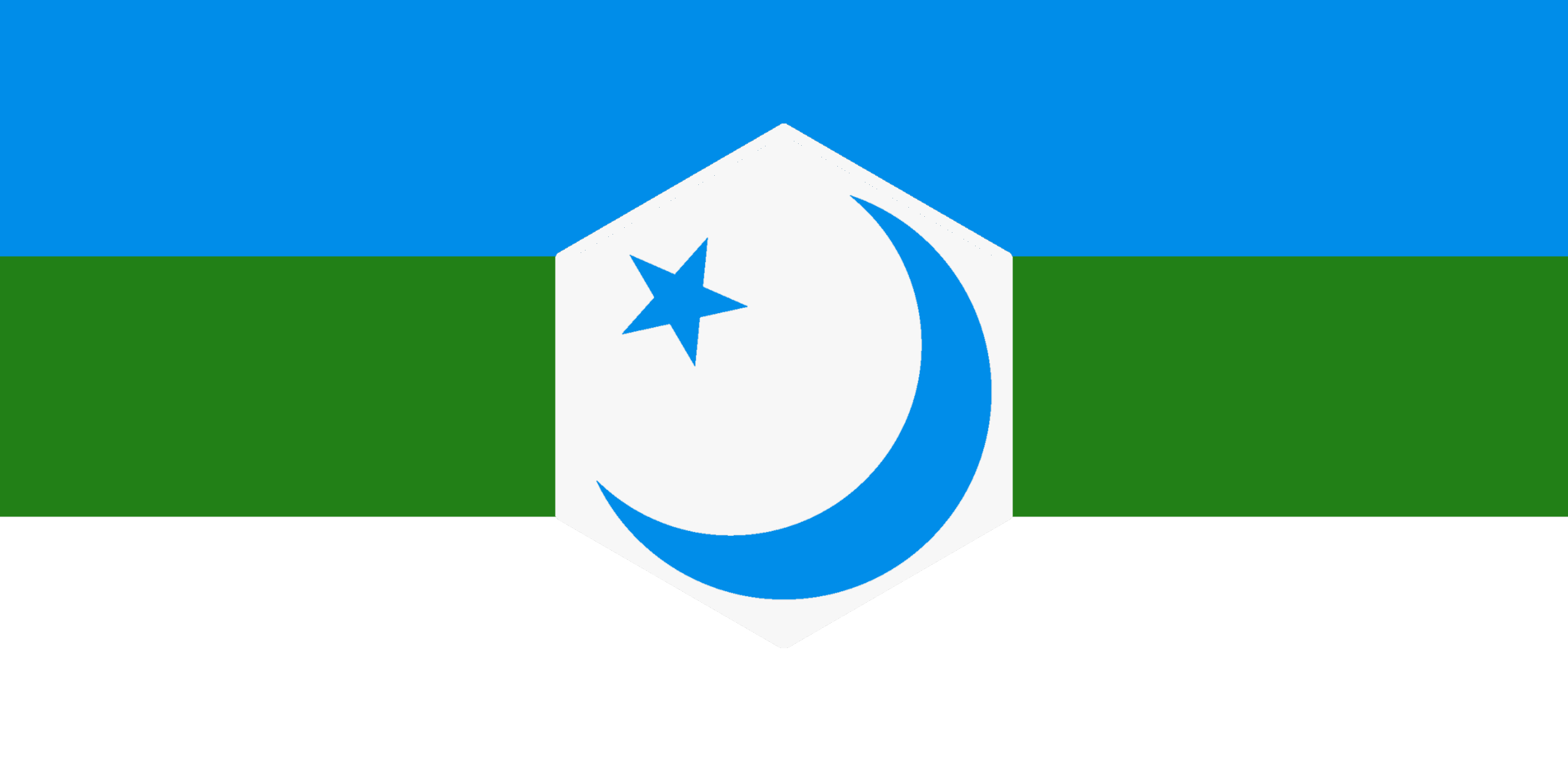
- Flag

The Bashkort Company (Ukrainian: Рота «Башкорт») is a military unit of the International Legion of Territorial Defense of Ukraine, which was formed from Bashkir volunteers in 2022 during the Russian-Ukrainian War.

== History ==
One of the former leaders of the banned nationalist organization "Bashkort" in Russia, political emigrant Ruslan Gabbasov, announced that a military unit of the same name had been created within the ranks of the Ukrainian armed forces. He stated that neither he nor the Bashkir National Political Center which he founded in exile, "have any connection to this military unit." He also emphasized that the unit has no ties to the former organization "Bashkort."

Former presidential adviser, Oleksiy Arestovych, while speaking in an interview with commentator Mark Feygin about the appearance of the unit, emphasized that it operates "not as part of the legion, but separately as part of the Ukrainian Armed Forces (ZSU)."

Since April 2023, the unit has been fighting in eastern Ukraine.
