= Russian military commissariats attacks =

2020s attacks by Russian partisan movement

2022–26 Russian military commissariats attacks
- Part of the anti-war protests in Russia, Terrorism in Russia and Russian partisan movement (2022–present)
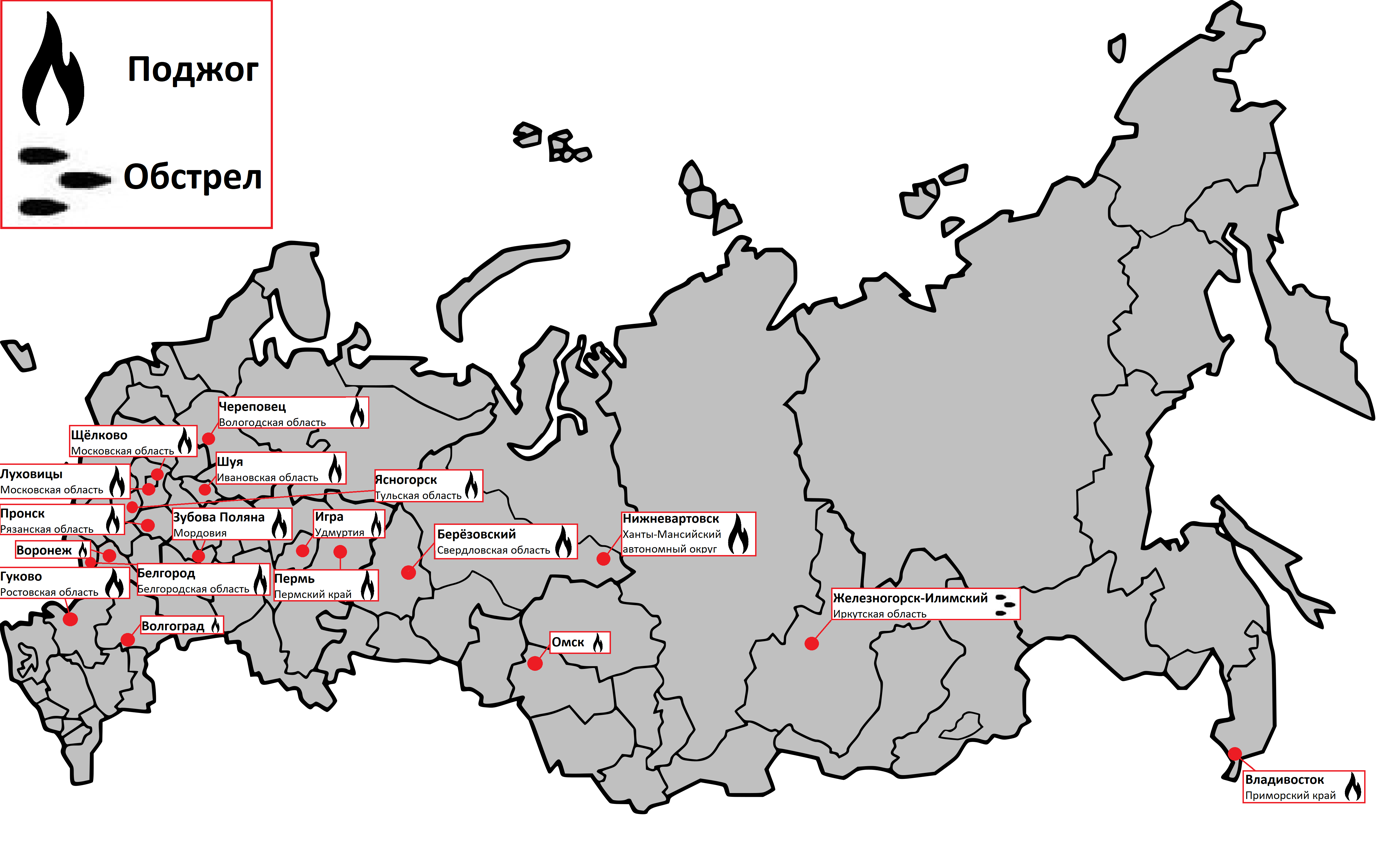
- Map of attacks on military commissariats in Russia since February 2022
- Date: 28 February 2022 – present
- Location: Russia
- Caused by: Russo-Ukrainian War; Russo-Ukrainian war (2022–present); 2022 Russian mobilization
- Methods: Molotov cocktail attacks; Arsons; Shooting
- Status: Ongoing

Parties
(Russia) Russian opposition: Anti-war activists; Black Bridge; Anti-mobilization activists; Committee of Bashkir Resistance; Army conscripts; (Russia) National Republican Army (alleged); BOAK; NS/WP; Supported by: Navalny Team	(Russia) Government: MO; AFRF; MVD; Police of Russia; SCRF; Rosgvardiya; OMON; FSB; SKR

Casualties
- Deaths: 13 (including 2 perpetrators)
- Injuries: >20

A series of Molotov cocktail arson attacks and shootings took place in Russian military commissariat registration and enlistment offices following the start of the country's invasion of Ukraine in 2022. Other governmental buildings were also attacked in multiple regions of Russia. Part of the Russian partisan and anti-war movements, the attacks were spurred by several factors, including the invasion of Ukraine, the deployment of Russian conscripts to the front line, the start of spring conscription, and rumors about possible mobilization in the country, which were later found to be true.

Commissariat offices recruit servicemen to the Russian Army and choose who is eligible and ineligible for service. The attacks were not a single coordinated campaign; and were led by a variety of people, from left-wing anarchists and scammers to far-right groups and assorted lone wolf actors.

== Chronology ==
Attacks on military commissariats and other government buildings in Russia after the invasion of Ukraine
Date	Place	Target	Method	Deaths	Injuries	Damage (per Russian authorities)	Ref.
28 February 2022	Lukhovitsy, Moscow Oblast	Military commissariat	Vandalism, Molotov attack, Graffiti	0	0	Shattered windows, "material damage"	
2 March 2022	Voronezh	Military commissariat	Molotov attack	0	0	Entrance door of the commissariat	
10 March 2022	Beryozovsky, Sverdlovsk Oblast	Military commissariat	Arson	0	0	Entrance doors of the commissariat	
18 March 2022	Shuya, Ivanovo Oblast	Military commissariat	Molotov attack	0	0	Window of the commissariat	
18 April 2022	Zubova Polyana, Mordovia	Military commissariat	Molotov attack	0	0	One office, several computers	
1 May 2022	Belgorod	Ministry of Defence facility	Arson (allegedly)	0	1	Unknown	
4 May 2022	Nizhnevartovsk	Military commissariat	Molotov attack	0	0	Wood paneling	
8 May 2022	Cherepovets	Military commissariat	Molotov attack	0	0	Two window frames, exterior decoration	
9 May 2022	Balashikha, Moscow Oblast	Military commissariat	Molotov attack	0	0	Window	
13 May 2022	Omsk	Military commissariat	Molotov attack	0	0	Windows	
13 May 2022	Gukovo, Rostov Oblast	Military commissariat	Molotov attack	0	0	No damage	
14 May 2022	Pronsk, Ryazan Oblast	Military commissariat	Arson	0	0	Entrance door and window	
15 May 2022	Volgograd	Military commissariat	Arson, Molotov attack	0	0	"Some used items"	
18 May 2022	Shchyolkovo, Moscow Oblast	Military commissariat	Molotov attack	0	0	Two offices, Military commissariat archive	
20 May 2022	Zheleznogorsk-Ilimsky, Irkutsk Oblast	Military commissariat	Air gun firing	0	0	Window	
20 May 2022	Igra, Udmurtia	Military commissariat	Molotov attack	0	0	Army reserve room	
28 May 2022	Simferopol	Military commissariat	Molotov attack (unsuccessful)	0	0	No damage	
31 May 2022	Yasnogorsk, Tula Oblast	Military commissariat	Axe attack, arson	0	0	Window	
8 June 2022	Vladivostok	Military commissariat	Molotov attack	0	0	Building cladding	
24 June 2022	Belgorod	Military commissariat	Molotov attack	0	0	Table in one of the offices, window	
24 June 2022	Perm	Military commissariat	Molotov attack	0	0	Two windows	
13 July 2022	Mozhaysk, Moscow Oblast	Military commissariat	Molotov attack	0	0	No damage	
15 July 2022	Mineralnye Vody, Stavropol Krai	Commissariat, City administration	Planned Molotov attack	0	0	Detained before arson	
20 July 2022	Uglich, Yaroslavl Oblast	Military commissariat	Planned Molotov attack	0	0	Detained before arson	
18 August 2022	Konakovo, Tver Oblast	Military commissariat	Molotov attack	0	0	Window frame	
3 September 2022	Izhevsk, Udmurtia	Police station	Molotov attack, stabbing	0	3	Two policemen received stab wounds, perpetrator received gunshot wounds	
22 September 2022	Tolyatti	City administration	Molotov attack	0	0	Entrance	
22 September 2022	Nizhny Novgorod	Military commissariat	Molotov attack	0	0	Dental office, window	
22 September 2022	Lomonosov, Saint Petersburg	Military commissariat	Molotov attack	0	0	Сhurch building window (by mistake)	
22 September 2022	Gay, Orenburg Oblast	Military commissariat	Arson	0	0	One wall	
22 September 2022	Kyra, Zabaykalsky Krai	Military commissariat	Molotov attack	0	0	Commissariat documentation	
23 September 2022	Svobodny, Amur Oblast	Military commissariat	Molotov attack	0	0	"Light damage"	
23 September 2022	Khabarovsk	Military commissariat	Molotov attack	0	0	Two offices	
23 September 2022	Kamyshin, Volgograd Oblast	City administration	Molotov attack	0	0	No damage	
23 September 2022	Tselinnoye, Altai Krai	House of Culture, village administration	Arson	0	0	Postal office	
23 September 2022	Kostroma	Military commissariat	Graffiti	0	0	One wall	
24 September 2022	Kansk, Krasnoyarsk Krai	Military commissariat	Arson	0	0	Furniture in one of the rooms	
24 September 2022	Salavat, Bashkortostan	United Russia office	Arson	0	0	Entrance door	
25 September 2022	Ruzayevka, Mordovia	Military commissariat	Molotov attack	0	0	One office	
25 September 2022	Chernyakhovsk, Kaliningrad Oblast	Military commissariat	Molotov attack	0	0	One wall	
25 September 2022	Kirovsk, Leningrad Oblast	Military commissariat	Arson	0	0	One office	
25 September 2022	Bereslavka, Volgograd Oblast	Village administration	Arson	0	0	All building, art school	
25 September 2022	Syaskelevo, Leningrad Oblast	Village administration	Molotov attack	0	0	Social protection office	
25 September 2022	Ryazan	Bus station	Self-immolation	0	1	No damage	
26 September 2022	Ust-Ilimsk, Irkutsk Oblast	Military commissariat	Shooting	0	1	Military commissar received gunshot wounds	
26 September 2022	Uryupinsk, Volgograd Oblast	Military commissariat	Molotov attack	0	0	"Significant damage"	
26 September 2022	Tarusa, Kaluga Oblast	Military commissariat	Molotov attack	0	0	Broken window	
26 September 2022	Beloomut, Moscow Oblast	Locality administration	Molotov attack	0	0	Double glazing and window sill	
27 September 2022	Vladivostok	Military commissariat	Molotov attack	0	0	Military pensioners accounting office	
28 September 2022	Vladivostok	Military commissariat	Molotov attack	0	0	Broken window, burnt windowsill and frame	
29 September 2022	Novosibirsk	Military commissariat	Molotov attack	0	0	Broken window	
29 September 2022	Zimovniki, Rostov Oblast	District administration	Molotov attack	0	0	One office	
30 September 2022	Nizhny Novgorod	Building of Federal Taxation Service	Molotov attack	0	0	No data	
30 September 2022	Krasnodar	Military commissariat	Arson	0	0	"The arsonist failed to start a big fire"	
1 October 2022	Kaa-Khem, Tuva Republic	Military commissariat	Arson	0	0	No data	
3 October 2022	Kazan	Military commissariat	Molotov attack	0	0	Grass near the military commissariat	
3 October 2022	Krasnoyarsk	Military commissariat	Molotov attack	0	0	"A small fire"	
5 October 2022	Zyuzino, Moscow Oblast	Military unit	Molotov attack	0	0	Burnt window cladding	
6 October 2022	Goryachy Klyuch, Krasnodar Krai	Military commissariat	Molotov attack	0	0	No damage	
9 October 2022	Arkhangelskoye, Bashkortostan	Military commissariat	Molotov attack	0	0	No damage	
11 October 2022	Bakal, Chelyabinsk Oblast	Locality administration	Molotov attack	0	0	No damage	
12 October 2022	Saint Petersburg	Sberbank branch	Molotov attack	0	0	No damage	
14 October 2022	Votkinsk, Udmurtia	Military commissariat	Molotov attack	0	0	No data	
14 October 2022	Cherkessk, Karachay-Cherkessia	Military commissariat	Arson	0	0	No data	
15 October 2022	Soloti, Belgorod Oblast	Military training area	Shooting	13 (including both perpetrators)	15	11 killed according to state-owned news agency RIA; both gunmen were killed	
16 October 2022	Shchyolkovo, Moscow Oblast	Military commissariat	Molotov attack	0	0	No damage	
17 October 2022	Mukhorshibir, Buryatia	Military commissariat	Molotov attack	0	0	Burnt facade	
26 October 2022	Kyzyl	Military commissariat	Molotov attack	0	0	Burnt window	
28 October 2022	Kemerovo	Military commissariat	Molotov attack	0	0	No data	
30 October 2022	Ust-Kan, Altai Republic	Military commissariat	Molotov attack	0	0	No damage	
30 October 2022	Almetyevsk, Tatarstan	Military commissariat	Arson	0	0	Detained before arson	
7 November 2022	Angarsk, Irkutsk Oblast	Military commissariat	Molotov attack	0	0	No damage	
23 December 2022	Ivanteyevka, Saratov Oblast	Military commissariat	Molotov attack	0	0	One room burnt out	
26 December 2022	Perm	Multi-story house housing a military commissariat	Arson	0	0	Fire spread up to 5 floors high	
27 December 2022	Podolsk, Moscow Oblast	Military commissariat	Arson	0	0	Burnt window	
29 December 2022	Yekaterinburg	Electrical substation	Arson	0	0	Detained before arson	
1 January 2023	Moscow	Military commissariat	Molotov attack	0	0	No damage	
9 January 2023	Bratsk, Irkutsk Oblast	Military commissariat	Arson	0	0	Damage on an area of a 50 square meters	
10 January 2023	Novokubansk, Krasnodar Krai	Federal Penitentiary Service archive	Arson	0	0	500-800 files of prisoners destroyed	
11 January 2023	Magdagachi, Amur Oblast	Military commissariat	Arson	0	0	Burnt window	
2 February 2023	Kovylkino, Mordovia	Military commissariat	Molotov attack	0	0	No damage	
21 February 2023	Bokhan, Irkutsk Oblast	Administration building	Arson	0	0	Arsonist failed to start a large fire	
23 February 2023	Murmansk	Military commissariat	Molotov attack	0	0	Windowframe damaged	
26 February 2023	Sosnovy Bor, Leningrad Oblast	Military commissariat	Molotov attack	0	0	Ceiling burnt out in a Social Fund of Russia's office	
28 February 2023	Kirovsk, Leningrad Oblast	Military commissariat	Molotov attack	0	0	Arsonist failed to start a fire	
6 March 2023	Novosibirsk	Aid collection point for draftees	Arson	0	0	Floor and a desk burned	
1 April 2023	Pervouralsk, Sverdlovsk Oblast	Military commissariat	Arson	0	0	Arsonist failed to start a fire	
12 April 2023	Usinsk, Komi Republic	Military commissariat	Molotov attack	0	0	No data	
25 April 2023	Yelets, Lipetsk Oblast	District administration office and court	Molotov attack	0	0	Arsonist failed to start a fire	
7 May 2023	Yekaterinburg	Military commissariat	Arson	0	0	Detained before arson	
8 May 2023	Likhoslavl, Tver Oblast	Military commissariat	Arson	0	0	Building's facade and a windowframe damaged	
11 May 2023	Usinsk, Komi Republic	Federal Security Service office	Molotov attack	0	0	Fire on an area of 1.5 sq m, burnt windowframe	
14 May 2023	Murmansk	Military commissariat	Arson	0	0	Burnt furniture and electronics in a social security office	
15 May 2023	Ulyanovsk	Police station	Arson	0	0	Burnt windowframe	
22 May 2023	Moscow	Military commissariat	Unexplained fire	0	0	"The scale of the damage is unclear"	
1 June 2023	Inza, Ulyanovsk Oblast	Military commissariat	Molotov attack	0	0	Fire was quickly extinguished	
3 June 2023	Magnitogorsk, Chelyabinsk Oblast	Military commissariat	Firework attack	0	0	Arsonist failed to start a fire	
4 June 2023	Asha, Chelyabinsk Oblast	Military commissariat	Molotov attack	0	0	No data	
7 June 2023	Vladimir	Military commissariat	Molotov attack	0	0	Fire was quickly extinguished	
8 June 2023	Tynda, Amur Oblast	Police station	Airsoft grenade attack	0	0	No data	
29 June 2023	St. Petersburg	Sberbank branch	Arson	0	0	Fire was quickly extinguished	
5 July 2023	Yoshkar-Ola	Sberbank branch	Molotov attack	0	0	Door burnt, glass shattered	
20 July 2023	Berdsk, Novosibirsk Oblast	Military commissariat	Arson	0	0	Door burnt	
29 July 2023	Feodosia, Crimea	Military commissariat	Molotov attack	0	0	Asphalt near the building burnt	
29 July 2023	Kazan	Military commissariat	Arson	0	0	Wall burnt	
29 July 2023	Severodvinsk, Arkhangelsk Oblast	Military commissariat	Molotov attack	0	0	Ground was set on fire	
30 July 2023	Sevastopol	Commandant's Service office	Molotov attack / self-immolation	0	1	Window damaged by shards	
31 July 2023	St. Petersburg	Military commissariat	Arson, car ramming	0	0	Burnt door, broken gates	
31 July 2023	Kazan	Military commissariat	Molotov attack	0	0	Arsonist failed to start a fire	
31 July 2023	Omsk	Military commissariat	Arson	0	0	No data	
31 July 2023	Kaluga	Military commissariat	Arson	0	0	No data	
31 July 2023	Mozhaysk, Moscow Oblast	Military commissariat	Arson	0	0	Windowframe burnt	
31 July 2023	Aginskoye, Zabaykalsky Krai	Military commissariat	Molotov attack	0	0	No data	
31 July 2023	Rossosh, Voronezh Oblast	Military commissariat	Molotov attack	0	0	No data	
31 July 2023	Podolsk, Moscow Oblast	Military commissariat	Arson	0	0	No data	
31 July 2023	Kopeysk, Chelyabinsk Oblast	Military commissariat	Molotov attack	0	0	No data	
31 July 2023	Volsk, Saratov Oblast	Military commissariat	Arson	0	0	No data	
31 July 2023	Maykop	Military commissariat	Molotov attack	0	0	Detained before arson	
1 August 2023	Ulan-Ude	Military commissariat	Molotov attack	0	0	Fire on an area of 1 sq m	
1 August 2023	Verkhneuralsk, Chelyabinsk Oblast	Military commissariat	Arson	0	0	No data	
1 August 2023	Moscow	Military commissariat	Molotov attack	0	0	Fire was extinguished	
1 August 2023	Stavropol	Military commissariat	Molotov attack	0	0	Detained before arson	
1 August 2023	Ishimbay, Bashkortostan	Military commissariat	Arson	0	0	No data	
1 August 2023	Sestroretsk, St. Petersburg	Military commissariat	Molotov attack	0	0	Detained before arson	
1 August 2023	Nakhodka, Primorsky Krai	Military commissariat	Molotov attack	0	0	No data	
14 August 2023	Polevskoy, Sverdlovsk Oblast	Military commissariat	Molotov attack	0	0	Door burnt	
15 August 2023	Chernyshevsk, Zabaykalsky Krai	Military commissariat	Arson	0	0	Arsonist failed to start a fire	
17 August 2023	Kirov	Mobilization tent	Arson	0	0	No data	
22 August 2023	Yekaterinburg	Military commissariat	Molotov attack	0	0	Little damage	
29 August 2023	Ufa	Military commissariat	Arson	0	0	Detained before arson	
29 August 2023	Moscow	Judicial sector	Arson	0	0	Fire on the surface of 6 sq m	
5 September 2023	St. Petersburg	Military commissariat	Bombing	0	0	No data	
18 September 2023	Blagoveshchensk	Military commissariat	Molotov attack	0	0	Grass near the building burnt	
21 September 2023	Magadan	Printing warehouse (mistaken for a military commissariat)	Molotov attack	0	0	Window broken	
27 September 2023	St. Petersburg	Military commissariat	Molotov attack	0	0	No damage	
27 September 2023	Kotelnich, Kirov Oblast	Contract service reception point	Arson	0	0	Little damage	
27 September 2023	Kornevo, Kaliningrad Oblast	Cadet classroom in a local school	Molotov attack	0	0	Arsonist failed to start a fire	
28 September 2023	Artyom, Primorsky Krai	Military commissariat	Molotov attack	0	0	Fire quickly went out	
15 March 2024	Borisoglebsk, Voronezh Oblast	Ballot box	Zelyonka attack	0	0	Ballots damaged	
15 March 2024	Moscow	Ballot box	Zelyonka attack	0	0	Ballots damaged	
15 March 2024	Moscow	Voting booth	Arson	0	0	No data	
15 March 2024	Kogalym, Khanty-Mansi Autonomous Okrug	Ballot box	Arson	0	0	Floor was set on fire; no damage to the ballots	
15 March 2024	St. Petersburg	Polling station	Molotov attack	0	0	No data	
15 March 2024	Simferopol	Ballot box	Zelyonka attack	0	0	Ballots damaged	
15 March 2024	Rostov-on-Don	Ballot box	Inking	0	0	Ballots damaged	
15 March 2024	Mytishchi, Moscow Oblast	Voting booth	Arson	0	0	Voting booth damaged	
15 March 2024	Asbest, Sverdlovsk Oblast	Polling station	Molotov attack	0	0	No data	
15 March 2024	Volzhsky, Volgograd Oblast	Ballot box	Zelyonka attack	0	0	Ballots damaged	
15 March 2024	Lytkarino, Moscow Oblast	Ballot box	Paint attack	0	0	One ballot damaged	
15 March 2024	Sochi, Krasnodar Krai	Ballot box	Zelyonka attack	0	0	Ballots damaged	
15 March 2024	Cheboksary	Ballot box	Arson	0	0	No data	
15 March 2024	Chelyabinsk	Polling station	Firecracker attack	0	0	No data	
15 March 2024	Ivanovo	Polling station	Arson	0	0	No data	
15 March 2024	Novosibirsk	Ballot box	Zelyonka/ink attack	0	0	No data	
15 March 2024	Izhevsk	Ballot box	Zelyonka/ink attack	0	0	No damage	
15 March 2024	Kurgan	Ballot box	Zelyonka/ink attack	0	0	No data	
15 March 2024	Veliky Novgorod	Ballot box	Paint attack	0	0	No damage	
15 March 2024	Yekaterinburg	Ballot box	Paint attack	0	0	Detained before ballot tampering	
16 March 2024	Kuragino, Krasnoyarsk Krai	Ballot box	Zelyonka attack	0	0	One ballot damaged	
16 March 2024	Tobolsk, Tyumen Oblast	Polling station	Firecracker attack	0	1	Perpetrator injured	
16 March 2024	Mayma, Altai Republic	Ballot box	Zelyonka attack	0	0	Detained before ballot tampering	
16 March 2024	Zelenogradsk, Kaliningrad Oblast	Ballot box	Zelyonka attack	0	0	Ballots damaged	
17 March 2024	Krasnodar	Polling station	Arson	0	0	"Insignificant damage"	
17 March 2024	Perm	Polling station	Firecracker attack	0	1	Perpetrator injured	
13 April 2024	Vladimir	Regional government office	Molotov attack	0	0	Car destroyed	

== Versions ==
In the Telegram channel "Oderint, Dum Metuant", the authors of which opposed the invasion of Ukraine and position themselves as a cell of the revived National Socialism / White Power, there were videos of some actions - on some unknown people set fire to cars with the letter Z, on others fires are visible in some buildings — the channel claims that supporters of the movement set fire to the warehouse of the "military facility", the police department and the military commissariats. The channel administrators even arranged a "quest", promising 15,000 rubles to anyone who sets fire to a car with the Z symbol, or 30,000 for setting fire to a police car. They planned to pay money in cryptocurrency. According to the security officials, the movement's associates could be involved in several arsons in central Russia.

In anonymous Telegram channels and on pro-Kremlin websites, allegations began to appear that the Security Service of Ukraine pays 30,000 rubles for setting fire to military commissariats, and this "must be filmed on camera".

According to another version, draft offices are set on fire by conscripts and those subject to possible mobilization.

=== Phone scams ===
Some reports indicate that some of the attacks are being committed by elderly people who have been tricked via phone to first hand over large amounts of money, and then in order to regain that money, perform an attack on a conscription center.

== Legal proceedings ==
After beginning of mobilization, Vladimir Tsimlyansky, Representative of General Staff of the Armed Forces of the Russian Federation, in an interview with Rossiyskaya Gazeta stated "arson of military commissariat will be qualified as terrorist attack or calls for terrorist attack". According to Criminal Code of Russia, a person can get up to 15 years in prison for those charges.

Two men — from Saint Petersburg and from Chernyakhovsk — were charged with "Intentional damage or destruction of someone else's property" under Article 167. The man from Volgograd was arrested for Molotov attack and is now detained on charges of Article 167 as well as Article 213 "Hooliganism".

Another case has been opened under Article 205 "Terrorist act" for Molotov attacker from Krasnodar.

== See also ==
- Russian partisan movement (2022–present)
- Russian mystery fires
- Attacks in Russia during the Russian invasion of Ukraine
