= Free Udmurtia =

Liberation Movement "Free Udmurtia" Освободительного движения «Свободная Удмуртия»
- Leader: Sergey Antonov
- Founded: 2023
- Ideology: Udmurt nationalism; Anti-Putinism
- National affiliation: Anti-Imperial Bloc of Nations

Party flag

The Liberation Movement "Free Udmurtia", or simply Free Udmurtia is a political movement that seeks the independence of the Udmurt Republic from the Russian Federation, and self determination of Udmurt people. It was founded on June 11, 2023, in Warsaw. It is a member of the Anti-Imperial Bloc of Nations.

The party supported the 2024 Bashkort protests, calling for the release of Fail Alsynov.
