= Gunijan =

The Gunijan Trust is an initiative for presenting Bangladesh personalities who inspire people through their writings, words, scientific and artistic works and other creative pursuits for peace, humanity and social justice. The thematic areas of Gunijan are: liberation movement, literature, education, law, science, social science, music, fine arts, philosophy, performing arts, mass media, human rights, sports, Adibashi rights, etc.

The organization is compiling and preserving their biographies, which are available on the group's website. It includes complete biography, selected writings/creative works, awards or recognitions, pictures and video (where available) on the life of Gunijan.

As internet access is not available across the country, Gunijan Trust publishes CDs with the biographies of these eminent persons. The CD "Mohima Tobo Udbhashito" was launched on February 26, 2008, unveiled by veteran women's rights activist Hena Das. CDs with profiles of the freedom fighters of the 1971 Liberation War were launched in 2009. The CD titled “Mohima Tobo Udbhashito: Muktisangram” is the third installment of the initiative, mainly featuring personalities who were involved in anti-colonial movements. Gunijan also organized exhibition in 2006 and in 2009.

Gunijan has received the special mention award of World Summit Award in 2009.
