= Soloti military training ground shooting =

2022 mass shooting in Soloti, Belgorod Oblast, Russia

- Part of Russian military commissariats attacks
- Map of the Valuysky District
- Location: 50°17′00.6″N 38°04′21.4″E; Soloti, Valuysky District, Belgorod Oblast, Russia
- Date: 15 October 2022; 4 years ago 10:00 (UTC+3)
- Attack type: Mass shooting, terrorist attack (Note: According to Russian authorities), mass murder
- Weapon: Firearms
- Deaths: 13 (including both perpetrators)
- Injuries: 15
- Perpetrators: Two soldiers from a CIS country,
- Motive: Islamic extremism

On 15 October 2022, a mass shooting occurred at a military training ground near Soloti, Valuysky District, Belgorod Oblast, Russia. Two gunmen opened fire on soldiers, killing 11 people and injuring 15 others.

== Events ==
The attack began when two soldiers, who were natives of a CIS country, opened fire on personnel of the unit. After killing 11 and injuring 15, they were killed by return fire. The attack occurred at a military training ground. According to Readovka the soldiers who were killed, mostly volunteers preparing to be sent to Ukraine, were going through a fire training session when the shooting happened. The Associated Press reported that the shooting happened at a military firing range.

According to the Russian Ministry of Defence, "the attack occurred during a fire training session with volunteers preparing for a special operation. Terrorists of one of the CIS countries fired small arms at the personnel of the unit, two shooters were killed by return fire." Officials said they were opening a criminal investigation into the incident.

The Russian media website ASTRA reported that the shooters were Muslim Tajik nationals, and that they had gotten into an argument with other soldiers whether the war in Ukraine was "holy" (the Tajiks' position being that the only just war would be one waged by Muslims against infidels). They began the shooting after a lieutenant colonel allegedly described Allah as a "weakling" and "coward." A "source close to the investigation committee" told RBK that the perpetrators were born in 1998 and 1999. The father of one of the alleged shooters confirmed to RFE/RL that his son had died during the weekend the shooting happened. The shooter's brother told RFE/RL that his sibling was an "ordinary migrant" who immigrated to Moscow from Southern Tajikistan several months before. The Tajikistan Ministry of Foreign Affairs said they were investigating reports that their citizens were involved in the attack.

== See also ==
- Gorny shooting
- Arkankergen mass murder
- 2023 Japan military facility shooting
- Ust-Ilimsk military commissariat shooting
