= Committee of Bashkir Resistance =

Armed nationalist organization in Bashkortostan

- Leader: Ruslan Gabbasov (suspected)
- Founded: 21 September 2022
- Active regions: Bashkortostan
- Ideology: Bashkir nationalism Self-determination

The Committee of Bashkir Resistance is a militant nationalist organization active in the Bashkortostan region of Russia. Its main goal is gaining independence for Bashkortostan. It was founded on 21 September 2022. It is mainly engaged in minor arson attacks on Russian government buildings and police stations.

== History ==
The Committee of Bashkir Resistance was founded on 21 September 2022. Several commissariats were attacked. After Russian partial mobilization, the Bashkir resistance posted

The time of demonstrations and protest marches are over, Putin and his allies can now expect bullets and Molotov cocktails.

On 24 September the group firebombed the United Russia offices in Salavat and on 3 October they firebombed the Communist Party of the Russian Federation office in the city. Russian officials suspect Ruslan Gabbasov, a prominent Bashkir émigré leader, is behind the creation and support of the committee. Russian political analyst Dmitry Oreshkin described the committee as:

the first swallow among the republics which are talking about independence.

Since partial mobilization, the Committee of Bashkir Resistance has been fighting an underground war against the Russian Government by firebombing commissariats, Federal Security Service offices and administration buildings. The group maintains ties with Gabbasov's Bashkir National Political Centre, the successor to Bashkort, a political organization banned by the Republic's Supreme Court in 2020 for being an extremist organization. The group officially supports further federalization and regional rights within Russia to achieve sovereignty, but has a large faction advocating for total independence. In August 2021, Fail Alsynov, the chairman of Bashkort, and Gabbasov staged a massive protest on the Kushtau mount where several thousand protesters clashed with local security forces. Radiy Khabirov, the Head of the Republic of Bashkortostan, personally negotiated with the protesters for their dispersal. Following the protest Alsynov and Gabbasov fled the county for Lithuania as criminal charges for creating an extremist organization where brought against them. On 10 October 2022, photos of armed Bashkir militants appeared on Telegram wearing chevrons with a blue hexagon and crescent, similar to the insignia of the army of Bashkortostan during the Russian civil war. The militants have stated they do not wish to fight for a Russian world and that Ukrainians had done nothing against the Bashkirs, and that they have sworn oaths to fight for the liberation of Bashkortostan.

The Committee issued a statement in favor of the 2024 Bashkortostan protests. Blogger AA considers the page hostile and issues a refutation

== See also ==
- 2022–2023 Belarusian and Russian partisan movement
- 2024 Bashkortostan protests
- National Liberation Struggle of the Bashkir People
- Russian Invasion of Ukraine
- Russian military commissariats attacks
- Russo-Ukrainian War
