= Yuldybayevo, Zilairsky District, Republic of Bashkortostan =

Yuldybayevo Юлдыбаево (Russian) Юлдыбай (Bashkir) Yuldıbay
- Selo
- Location within Bashkortostan Location within Russia
- Coordinates: 52°20′N 57°52′E
- Country: Russia
- Region: Bashkortostan
- District: Zilairsky District
- Time zone: UTC+5:00

Yuldybayevo (Russian: Юлдыбаево; Bashkir: Юлдыбай, romanized: Yuldıbay) is a rural locality (a selo) and the administrative centre of Yuldybayevsky Selsoviet, Zilairsky District, Bashkortostan, Russia. The population was 1,650 as of 2010.

== Geography ==
Yuldybayevo is located 39 km northeast of Zilair (the district's administrative centre) by road. Maloyuldybayevo is the nearest rural locality.

== Notable people ==
- Fail Alsynov (born 1986), Bashkir public figure, activist, nationalist and oppositionist
