= Bashkir liberation movement =

The Bashkir liberation movement is a series of military clashes and uprisings of the Bashkir people against the Russian Empire that colonized Bashkortostan, as well as protests and rallies against the policies of the Russian Federation (in particular, against discrimination of the Bashkir people on national and linguistic grounds).

== Russian Empire ==
Bashkirs are one of the ancient peoples of Eurasia, formed as a separate ethnos of the Southern Urals in the first millennium AD. After the collapse of the Golden Horde, the territory of modern Bashkortostan was divided between the Kazan and Siberian Khanates and the Nogai Horde. After the fall of Kazan in October 1552, Bashkortostan was conquered the Russian Empire. Since then, a gradual but systematic policy of assimilation and Russification has been pursued towards the Bashkirs. At the same time, Russian entrepreneurs sought to obtain land holdings in the Urals to extract furs and exploit other resources of the region. Ivan the Terrible promised not to touch the lands, religions and customs of the Bashkirs, and also promised them protection and patronage from all enemies. Many Bashkirs therefore considered submission to Moscow as an escape from the ongoing feuds and wars. Nevertheless, once within the Russian state, the Bashkir people faced oppression by Russian landlords and officials, as well as their own feudal lords. With the arrival of the Russian state, mass construction of towns and fortresses, strongholds of colonization, began in Baskhir lands, where servicemen and officials lived. In return for their service, they received land from the Russian government. In addition, the officials increased the amount of tribute collected from the local population. In the 18th-19th centuries Russian settlers began to populate Bashkiria intensively.

Due to discontent of Bashkirs with the Russian policy popular uprisings arose. Eight major uprisings of the Bashkir people took place from the 1600s to the 1800s.

The rebellion of 1662-1664 began because of the violation of fief land rights and tax collectors. The protest was led by large landowners, some of whom renounced their allegiance to Russian and wished to recreate an independent Siberian khanate. Russia struggled to militarily defeat the rebellion, and so conceded some Bashkir demands on land and taxation.

Bashkirs revolted again from 1681-1684 against the forced Christianization of Muslims. The protest was supported by the Kalmyk Khanate, which was also under the protectorate of Russia. Because of this, the Russian government had to abandon the policy of Christianization of Muslims, officially condemned the seizure of Bashkir fiefdoms, and satisfied the demands of the Bashkirs to comply with the terms of Bashkortostan's annexation to Russia.

From 1704-1711 there was a rebellion against the Russian attempt to introduce 72 new taxes, particularly on mosques and mullahs to discourage the practice of Islam. Tsar Peter I also ordered that all mosques built would be on the model of Christian churches, as well as to arrange cemeteries near mosques, and to record marriages and deaths of parishioners to mullahs only in the presence of an Orthodox priest. In addition, the Bashkirs were required to provide 20,000 horses and 4000 soldiers for the Great Northern War against Sweden. At the height of the revolt, the Bashkir nobility renounced Moscow's allegiance. In 1707, the creation of the Bashkir Khanate, bound by vassalage to the Crimean Khanate and the Ottoman Empire, was proclaimed. Hazi Akkuskarov, one of the rebel leaders, was proclaimed Bashkir khan at the council of elders. The Muscovites had to agree to all the Bashkirs' demands in order to stop the rebellion from spreading to other territories. According to some sources, the Bashkirs swore anew to the Russian emperor only in 1725.

The uprising of 1735-1740 was a response to the organization by the Russian authorities of the Orenburg military-political expedition, which aimed to establish colonial orders in Bashkortostan. The punitive expedition of Russian General Rumyantsev during the suppression of the uprising killed, executed or exiled to penal servitude 40,000-60,000 Bashkirs. More than 250 settlements and the main mosque were also burned down. The rebels continued armed guerrilla warfare in the Ural Mountains. After the suppression, many fief lands of the Bashkirs were taken away and given to the servant Meshcheryaks. Some Bashkir historians consider the repressions during 1735-1740 to be the first genocide of the Bashkir people. The American historian Alton Stewart Donnelly estimates that one fourth of the Bashkir population died.

The uprising of 1747 was, like the 1704-1711 rebellion, caused by an increase in taxes. The protest was quickly suppressed. The leaders of the uprising were exiled to eternal servitude in the fortress of Rogervik, other participants were subjected to corporal punishment or exiled outside the region.

Another uprising of the Bashkir people occurred from 1755-1756, caused by the seizure of the Bashkirs' fief lands, the growth of taxes, attempts to Christianize Muslims, and the perceived arbitrariness of the Orenburg province administration. Mullah Abdulla Aliyev Batyrsha, called on Bashkirs, Tatars, Kazakhs and Uzbeks to "holy war", but only Bashkirs acted en masse. The main rebel forces retreated to Kazakhstan under the onslaught of Russian troops. Moscow authorities used bribery to achieved the extradition of Bashkirs. Of the rebels (50 thousand military men and their families) who were hiding in the Kazakhs, no more than 12-15 thousand returned home.

Pugachev's Rebellion (1773-1775) was the most well-known mass insurgency, led by Salawat Yulayev. It was started by local Cossacks. The Cossacks were joined by Bashkirs, Tatars, Kalmyks, Kazakhs, Chuvash, Ural factory peasants and others. The revolt covered a vast territory, many towns, fortresses and factories were captured. Emelyan Pugachev, who declared himself Emperor Peter III, promised independence to the Bashkirs, so two thirds of the clans came to his side. Yulayev is considered the national hero of Bashkortostan; his symbolic image is on the coat of arms of the Republic of Bashkortostan.

The last major uprising of the Bashkirs took place from 1834-1835, caused by another attempt of the Russian authorities to restrict their rights. As a result of the uprising, the Bashkirs managed to preserve their economic and legal freedom.

The American historian Alton S. Donnelly studied the Tsarist policy adopted after the Bashkirs were incorporated into the Russian Empire and believes that Bashkir uprisings were usually caused by violations by the Russian government of the terms previously agreed upon between the Bashkirs and the Russian authorities. Donnelly concludes that Russia systematically pursued an imperialist policy with consistent infringement of Bashkir interests.

The result of the conquest of Bashkortostan was a significant expansion of the territory and increase in the population of the Russian Empire at the expense of the Bashkirs losing the opportunity to create their own separate nation-state.

== Soviet Union ==
After the February Revolution of 1917, the Bashkir national movement for the establishment of national-territorial autonomy began in the region. In July–August 1917, the I and II All-Bashkir Congresses (kurultais) were held in Orenburg, where it was decided to establish a "democratic republic on national-territorial principles" within federative Russia. The Bashkir Regional Council (shuro) elected by the first and re-elected by the second congresses worked in Orenburg.

In order to consolidate forces, on September 23, 1918, in Ufa was convened the State Meeting, better known as the Ufa Directory, which made a collective decision to transfer supreme power to the All-Russian Provisional Government until the Constituent Assembly was convened. On November 18, 1918, A. V. Kolchak staged a military coup and declared himself Supreme Ruler of Russia and Supreme Commander-in-Chief of Russia's armed forces. Admiral Kolchak did not recognize the autonomy of the Bashkirs. All local governments were asked to declare self-liquidation. Thus, Bashkirs and Cossacks found themselves in a difficult situation. In the conditions of the Kolchakovs' retreat to Siberia, they found themselves without support in the face of the advancing forces of the Red Army. The leaders of the Bashkir autonomy were forced to start negotiations with the Soviets. On February 18, 1919, the Bashkir government and the Bashkir Corps came over to the side of the USSR. On March 20, 1919, the "Agreement of the Russian Workers' and Peasants' Government with the Bashkir Government on the Soviet Autonomy of Bashkiria" was concluded. March 23, 1919 is considered to be the official date of formation of the Bashkir Soviet Republic.

In 1918-1921 mass anti-Bolshevik uprisings of peasants, caused by dissatisfaction with the policy of Soviet power, began. The uprisings were suppressed.

In 1936, the Bashkir ASSR was officially denied transformation into a union republic within the USSR. On June 23, 1937, the first Constitution of the Bashkir ASSR was adopted.

The policy of assimilation and Russification was especially purposefully pursued during the years of Soviet power. Russification and forced displacement of the Bashkir language and culture dealt a significant blow to the Bashkirs as a people. The Soviet authorities threw great efforts into eradicating "nationalism" in favor of creating a "Soviet man" without nationality. Nevertheless, the Bashkir national movement began to gain momentum at the turn of the 1980s-90s. In 1988, a group of mainly Bashkir intellectuals (writers and university professors) was formed. Meetings were held clandestinely, often in apartments. The Bashkir People's Center "Ural" was established, standing at the forefront of the struggle to raise the state status of Bashkiria and support the recognition of the status of the state Bashkir language. The Bashkir youth organization "Union of Bashkir Youth" also became a driving force in the struggle for a sovereign Bashkortostan.

== Russian Federation ==
On October 11, 1990, in connection with the adoption of the Declaration of State Sovereignty, the republic was transformed into the Bashkir Soviet Socialist Republic - Bashkortostan.

Since March 31, 1992, the Republic of Bashkortostan has been a part of the Russian Federation. In 1993, the Constitution of the Republic was adopted, reflecting many aspirations of the Bashkir people. A year later, the Republic of Bashkortostan and the Russian Federation signed a Federal Agreement on the Delimitation of Powers and Competence, according to which Bashkortostan was granted many republican rights within the Russian Federation. However, when Vladimir Putin came to power, many of the republic's rights were curtailed. The Constitution of Bashkortostan was rewritten under pressure from Moscow, and many articles and clauses were deleted.

The difficult socio-economic situation during Putin's rule led to protest moods in the region. In 2005, thousands of people gathered in the center of Ufa, the capital of Bashkiria, demanding the restoration of social benefits abolished by the new monetization law. They also demanded higher pensions and wages.

In response to the curtailment of constitutional rights and ongoing Russification, Bashkirs formed the nationwide organizations Kuk Bure and Bashkort (2014). These organizations raised the issues of protecting the rights and interests of the Bashkir people, the return of the republic's sovereignty and the 1993 Constitution of Bashkortostan. "Bashkort" held mass public actions in defense of the sovereignty of Bashkortostan, the Bashkir language and culture, and opposed the repression of activists of the Bashkir national movement, which has been ongoing since the election of President V. Putin.

Criminal cases were brought against activists, in particular against the leaders of Kuk Bure and Bashkort, and some participants received prison sentences. In 2020, Bashkort was banned. One of the founders of the organization, Ruslan Gabbasov, was forced to flee Russia and found political asylum in Lithuania. He then formed the Bashkir National Political Center, which coordinates political activities aimed at gaining independence for the Republic of Bashkortostan. The Bashkir National Political Center joined the League of Free Nations, where representatives of national and regional movements of the Russian Federation fight for the independence of their peoples from Russia.

Since 2022, the Bashkirs have been creating an armed underground. The main goals of the struggle are the national independence of Bashkiria, as well as the cessation of Russia's war of conquest with the forced mobilization of Bashkirs into the ranks of its armed forces.

As of October 19, 2022, there were 2,700 people in the ranks of Bashkirs who had announced plans to engage in armed resistance to the Russian Federation. On October 3, partisans set fire to the office of the KPRF party in Salavat. On October 8, a military recruitment office was set on fire in the district center of Arkhangelsky District, 65 kilometers from Ufa. The activists demanded independence of the republic and also opposed the participation of Bashkirs in the war with Ukraine.

== Language issue ==
Today in Bashkortostan there is a policy of reducing the use of the Bashkir language: communication in the Bashkir language is not accepted in any institution, practically all websites of state, municipal, and educational institutions do not allow registration in the Bashkir language.

In 2017, Vladimir Putin said that people should not be forced to learn a language "that is not their mother tongue." There has been controversy over the compulsory study of the Bashkir language at school.

In January 2019, the Advisory Committee of the Framework Convention for the Protection of National Minorities of the Council of Europe criticized Russia for its national policy. The experts expressed concern about "the growing dominance of the Russian language" and at the same time "the lack of effective support for national minority languages". Bashkortostan is illustrative in this respect: in the 2021–2022 academic year, 99% of students in Bashkiria studied their native language. Of these, 68% chose Russian, 21% Bashkir and 9% Tatar. In addition, the native languages of the national republics of the Russian Federation are no longer part of the compulsory school program, unlike the compulsory Russian language.

Moscow has pursued a policy of dismantling or reducing the size of several ethnic groups either by supporting linguistic schisms and cultural diversity within specific communities or by trying to create a super-ethnos to dilute national identities. One notable case involves relations between Bashkirs and Tatars in two Middle Volga republics. The Kremlin has manipulated and highlighted claims by some nationalists in both ethnicities that their populations have been assimilated by the other ethnic group. The primary objective is to divide the two nations, reduce the number of self-identifying Bashkirs, and curtail demands for sovereignty and potential statehood by Bashkortostan.

== Eco-activism and environmental protests in Bashkortostan ==
The corruption of the Moscow authorities and their consumerist policy towards the resources of Bashkortostan became the reason for environmental protests in the republic and the corresponding reaction of the authorities to them. In 2016, civil activist Alexander Veselov, chairman of the Union of Environmentalists of Bashkiria, was attacked in Ufa. The attack took place after he published a special report "Ecology and Ecolokhy in Bashkortostan" analyzing the activities of the Ministry of Ecology of the Russian Federation and exposing the Ministry's falsifications of publicly important information (e.g., on emissions of harmful substances into the atmosphere).

In 2017, a well-known Bashkir public figure, civil activist and journalist Anver Yumagulov was beaten unconscious.

In 2018, the Kushtau mountain (140 km from Ufa) was transferred to Bashkir Soda Company for mining lime, after which the local population protested - in particular, after mass logging began. Local residents consider Kushtau to be part of a single mountain massif with the Toratau and Yuraktau shikhans, which have the status of natural monuments. During two weeks of protests, about 80 activists were detained, and several of them were given administrative arrests.

In August 2020, thousands of protesters organized marches and blocked roads to protect the Kushtau conservation areas. People lined up in a living chain with a huge flag of the republic. The confrontation with law enforcers continued for several days. The protesters, among other things, called for free elections to the regional government, which would have to support the people's demands rather than fulfill the will of the Kremlin. Engagement in environmental politics, claiming territories as relevant for Bashkir history and culture, and thus the negotiation of what constitutes a Bashkir natural and cultural heritage may also be interpreted as a reaction to a decisive crackdown by the state on ethnic minority nationalism. Being primarily engaged in environmental or cultural matters is not necessarily viewed as too problematic. The agenda of environmental activists can therefore be considered more complex and multi-layered than it seems at first sight.

Active environmental protests continued in 2023: eco-activist Ilsur Irnazarov was fined for organizing a gathering against illegal gold mining, in Bashkortostan there was a people's gathering in defense of the Irandyk Ridge from gold miners.

The growing wave of eco-activism in the republic increasingly resembles citizens' struggle for self-government. The Russian authorities are responding with bans: for example, the Administration of the Tanalyk Village Council of the Khaibullinsky District of Bashkortostan refused to approve a citizens' meeting on the issue of resettlement of local residents in connection with subsoil development.

On January 15, 2024, hundreds of people came to the Baimak court in Bashkortostan to support eco-activist Fail Alsynov, who was charged with incitement to hatred because of his speech at a rally against gold mining. Those who came chanted slogans such as "Freedom to Fail Alsynov!", "Azatlyk!" ("Freedom!"), "Fail, we are with you!" and demanded the resignation of the region's head Radiy Khabirov. On January 17, the day of Alsynov's sentencing, several thousand people came to the courthouse. After learning that the activist was sentenced to four years, the protesters blocked the road, preventing the truck from leaving the courthouse. The protest turned into clashes with law enforcement agencies. The riot police used batons and tear gas cannons.

== See also ==
- Ruslan Gabbasov
- 2024 Bashkortostan protests
- Committee of Bashkir Resistance
