= Liberation movement =

Organization or political movement

A liberation movement is an organization or political movement leading a rebellion, or a non-violent social movement, against a colonial power or national government, often seeking independence based on a nationalist identity and an anti-imperialist outlook.

== Notable liberation movements ==
- Animal liberation movement, a movement to stop killing animals for human needs.
- Free-culture movement, a movement promoting free and open access to distribute and modify content and culture.
- Free software movement, a movement to liberate users ability to run, study, modify, and redistribute software source code.
- Gay liberation, a movement that urged lesbians and gay men to engage in direct action, and to be proud of their sexuality.
- Goa liberation movement, a movement which fought to end Portuguese colonial rule in Goa, India.
- Men's liberation movement, a social movement critical of the restraints which society imposes on men.
- Prison abolition movement, which seeks to reduce and eliminate incarceration through practices like transformative justice and decarceration.
- Russian Liberation Movement, a movement within the Soviet Union created by Nazi Germany that sought to create a fascist and anti-communist armed force during World War II.
- Women's liberation movement, a movement of women who proposed that economic, psychological, and social freedom were necessary for women to be equal to men.

== See also ==
- Bashkir liberation movement
- Buryat liberation movement
- Civil disobedience
- List of active autonomist and secessionist movements
- List of historical autonomist and secessionist movements
- List of national liberation movements recognized by intergovernmental organizations
- Non-state actor
- Wars of national liberation
