= Ust-Ilimsk military commissariat shooting =

September 2022 incident in Irkutsk Oblast, Russia

- Part of 2022 Russian military commissariats attacks
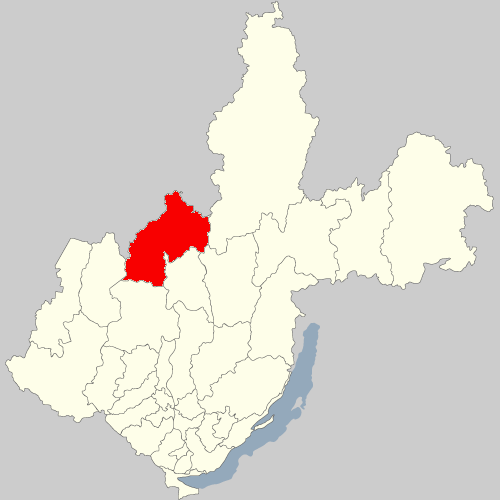
- Location: Ust-Ilimsk, Irkutsk Oblast, Russia
- Date: 26 September 2022; 12:20 or 14:00 (UTC+08:00)
- Attack type: Shooting
- Weapon: Sawed-off shotgun
- Injuries: 1 (Aleksandr Eliseev)
- Perpetrator: Ruslan Zinin
- Motive: Dissatisfaction with mobilization

The Ust-Ilimsk military commissariat shooting occurred on 26 September 2022, when 25-year-old local resident Ruslan Zinin wounded the military commissar Alexander Eliseev by shooting him with a sawed-off shotgun, after which he was detained.

== Shooting ==
On the afternoon of 26 September 2022 at 12:20 local time (according to other sources - at 14:00) Ruslan Zinin came to the draft board, went up to the assembly hall together with conscripts for mobilization. He went up to the military commissar Alexander Eliseev, said: "Now we'll all go home" and opened fire from a sawn-off shotgun, shot at point-blank range. According to an eyewitness, the attacker had a gun, like from the movie "Brother 2". At that moment, Eliseev was instructing the mobilized, he received 6 wounds in the chest. No one else was hurt. Zinin tried to escape through the fire door, but it was locked. The offender shot at the door, but did not have time to escape. He was detained by the National Guard.

The wounded Alexander Eliseev was taken to resuscitation in critical condition. On the morning of 27 September, after doctors managed to stabilize Eliseev, it was decided to transfer him to Irkutsk. On September 29, a video was published on the Telegram channel of the governor of Irkutsk Oblast, Igor Kobzev, in which the head physician of the Irkutsk Regional Clinical Hospital, Pyotr Dudin, said that Eliseev was taken out of a medically induced coma, and his condition was assessed as serious but stable.

== Suspect ==
A resident of Ust-Ilimsk, Ruslan Alexandrovich Zinin (born 29 June 1997), is suspected of committing a crime. During the arrest, he presented himself as unemployed. However, there is information that he, along with his mother, was the founder of an art glass studio, organized in 2015. The business closed after a year. The criminal's mother, Maria Zinina, said that Ruslan had recently lived with his grandmother. A resident of Ust-Ilimsk named Alexander, who worked with Zinin, said that Ruslan was calm, he worked on a timber truck. According to Zinin, in March 2022, his 19-year-old friend Daniil was killed during the 2022 Russian invasion of Ukraine. After Russian president Vladimir Putin announced the mobilization, Zinin's cousin, 21-year-old Vasily Gurov, received a summons to the draft board. Ruslan himself was not called up for military service, but he told his relatives that he volunteered. Before the shooting on the same day, September 26, Zinin had already come to the draft board. According to an eyewitness, he tried to find out why his friend received a summons, although he did not serve in the army. In response, the military commissar insulted Zinin. After that, Ruslan returned to the draft board again with a sawed-off shotgun and opened fire.

From the open letter, written by Zinin after his arrest on October 5th 2022 and published on November 19th through his mother:

«...On that day I sincerely went to the military commissariat with a confidence that it is within my strength not to allow that my younger brother be mobilized in accordance with the draft that was assigned to him earlier on that day. I also, until the last moment, was sacredly sure that I will not cause anyone any harm. I am categorically against violence from young age. Everyone who knows me closely can confirm that...

...To this day I am tormented by nightmares after I saw a post-mortem photograph of my school friend, 18-year old guy, a soldier of compulsory service, who was drafted in November 2021 and who died in March 2022, in first days of SVO. When I imagined just for a moment that I some day, god forbid, will have to see my dear family member in such a way, I understood that I could not live, knowing that I did nothing to prevent it...»

== Victim ==
Wounded as a result of the shooting, Alexander Vladimirovich Eliseev began serving in the Armed Forces in 1983. He served in the Red Banner Central Asian Border District of the KGB of the USSR, on the border with Afghanistan, after which he went through a military school and academy, served as an officer. Since 2010, he headed the military commissariat of Ust-Ilimsk. In the city, Alexander Eliseev is respected; he has put forward his candidacy for elections to the city duma and the legislative assembly of the Irkutsk region more than once. The victim's nephew Ivan described Alexander Eliseev positively.

== Aftermath ==
The Investigative Committee of the ICR for the Irkutsk Oblast opened a criminal case against Ruslan Zinin under articles 317 (assault on the life of a law enforcement officer) and 222 (illegal acquisition, transfer, sale, storage, transportation, transfer or carrying of weapons, the main parts of firearms, ammunition) of the Criminal Code of Russia.

On 28 September, the city court of Ust-Ilimsk arrested Ruslan Zinin for 2 months (until November 26).

On January 19, 2024, Zinin was sentenced to 19 years in prison. On July 30, the prison term was increased to 20 years.

== See also ==
- Izhevsk school shooting another shooting that occurred later, on the same day;
- Soloti military training ground shooting
