= Ishmurzino =

Ishmurzino Ишмурзино
- Selo
- Location within Bashkortostan Location within Russia
- Coordinates: 52°26′N 58°10′E
- Country: Russia
- Region: Bashkortostan
- District: Baymaksky District
- Time zone: UTC+5:00

Ishmurzino (Russian: Ишмурзино; Bashkir: Ишмырҙа, romanized: İşmırźa) is a rural locality (a selo) and the administrative centre of Ishmurzinsky Selsoviet, Baymaksky District, Bashkortostan, Russia. The population was 806 as of 2010. There are 11 streets.

== Geography ==
Ishmurzino is located 22 km southwest of Baymak (the district's administrative centre) by road. Bogachyovo and Verkhnemambetovo are the nearest rural localities.

== See also ==
- 2024 Bashkortostan protests
