= Yuldybayevo =

Yuldybayevo Юлдыбаево
- Village
- Location within Bashkortostan Location within Russia
- Coordinates: 51°51′N 56°38′E
- Country: Russia
- Region: Bashkortostan
- District: Zianchurinsky District
- Time zone: UTC+5:00

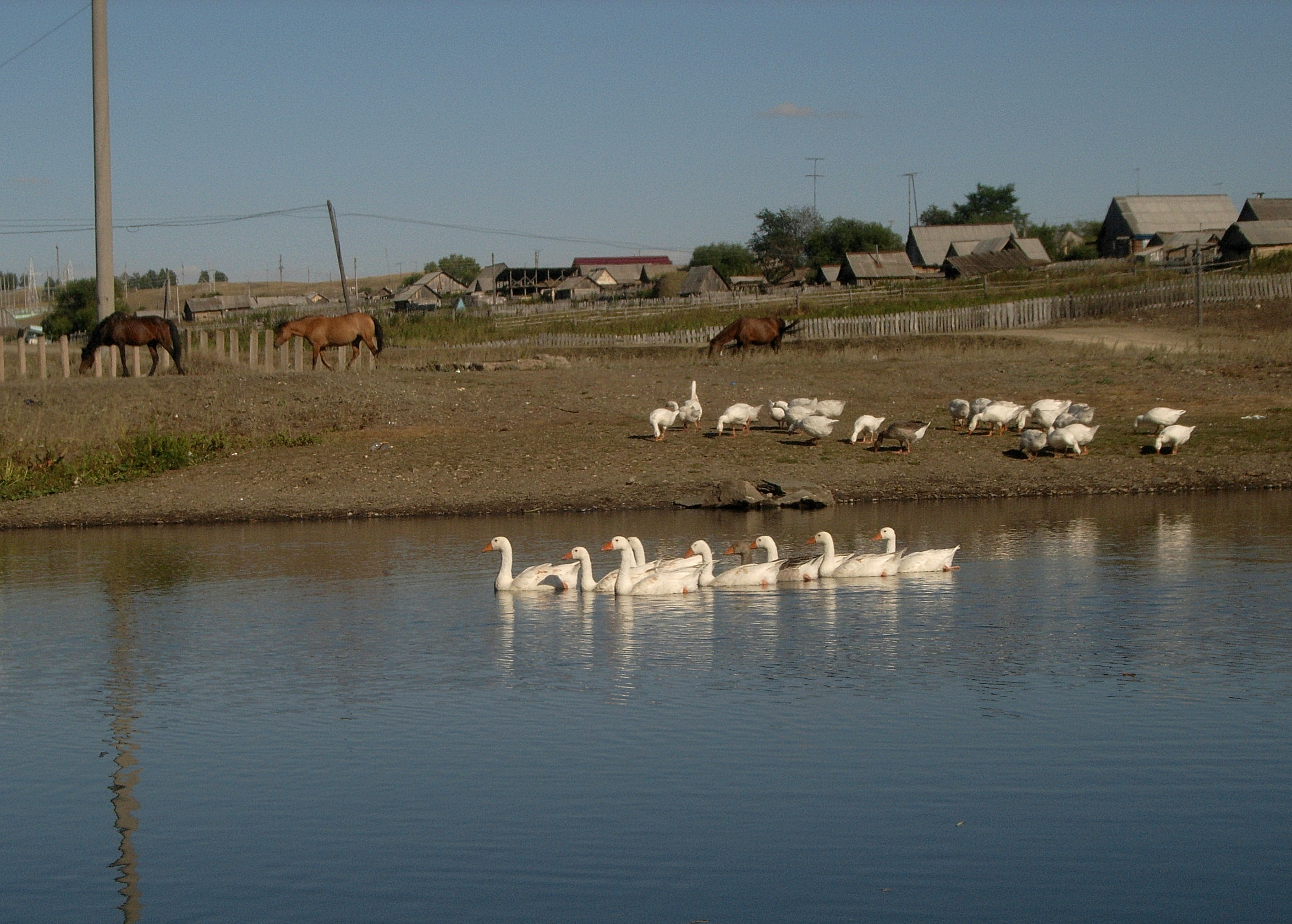
The river Sakmara in August 2008 near Yuldybaevo village.

Yuldybayevo (Russian: Юлдыбаево; Bashkir: Юлдыбай, romanized: Yuldıbay) is a rural locality (a village) in Abzanovsky Selsoviet, Zianchurinsky District, Bashkortostan, Russia. The population was 137 as of 2010. There are 5 streets.

== Geography ==
Yuldybayevo is located 58 km south of Isyangulovo (the district's administrative centre) by road. Petrovskoye is the nearest rural locality.
