= Ruslan Gabbasov =

Bashkir activist (born 1979)

- Born: 18 July 1979 (age 47); Ishimbay, Bashkir Autonomous Soviet Socialist Republic
- Occupations: Bashkir activist, one of the leaders of the Bashkir national movement abroad, founder of the Bashkir National Political Center and Bashkort

Ruslan Salavatovich Gabbasov (Russian: Руслан Салаватович Габбасов; Bashkir: Руслан Салауат улы Ғәббәсов, romanized: Ruslan Salawat ulı Ğäbbäsov; born 18 July 1979) is a Bashkir activist, one of the leaders of the Bashkir national movement abroad, founder of the Bashkir National Political Center and Bashkort. Leader and speaker of the Free Nations of Post-Russia Forum.

== Biography ==
Born on July 18, 1979, in Ishimbay, Bashkortostan. Graduated from the History Department of Bashkir State University in 2017.

In 2011, Gabbasov began his public activities, joining the liberal-nationalist Bashkir organization "Kuk Bure" ("Heavenly Wolf"), where he was elected deputy head. "Kuk Bure" together with the Russian People's Center "Patriot" held pickets against the lawlessness of ethnic crime, as well as against anti-people corruption in the state authorities (in fact - against the influx of criminal elements of Caucasian nationality into the region). The participants held placards "Bashkortostan is NOT the Caucasus", "Uz ereme - uzem khuzha" ("you are the master of your own land"), "Kuk bure for democracy".

In 2014, there was a split in the ranks of Kuk Bure, during which all three deputy heads of the organization Azat Salmanov - Ramzil Bainazarov, Fail Alchinov and Gabbasov - left the organization and formed the Bashkir public organization Bashkort, which has a similar ideology.

Gabbasov took the post of first deputy head in the new organization. "Kuk-Bure" was officially self-dissolved by Salmanov in 2018.

The Bashkort organization advocated for the sovereignty of Bashkortostan, supported the Bashkir language and culture, fought against the distribution of counterfeit alcohol and repression of other Bashkir activists, and protected the Toratau and Kushtau Shikhans and other natural monuments. In 2020, it was recognized by the Russian authorities as extremist and closed down.

=== Bashkort activity ===
The first action of the Bashkort organization was against the second Russian March in the city of Ufa in November 2014. Bashkort activists pasted up leaflets calling for the march to be banned, organized "Gatherings of Batyrs", and held solitary pickets with protests.

Bashkort also collected signatures for the opening of a Bashkir kindergarten in the Ufa district. The collection of signatures was successful - the Akzubat kindergarten was opened in early 2015.

In 2015, a criminal case was opened against Gabbasov and another Bashkort representative for beating Ilmir Mambetov, head of the Orenburg Kurultai of Bashkirs. According to pro-government and Russian nationalist media, the reason was allegedly that Mambetov refused to open a Bashkort branch in his city.

In the opinion of Bashkort's leadership, the criminal case was initiated in order to intimidate them and stop the organization's activities. The case was suspended. However, until its closure in 2019, it was often used by the Ministry of Internal Affairs of the Russian Federation in order to detain and summon for questioning the leadership of Bashkort in the framework of criminal proceedings during the organization's regular actions. In 2015, due to the authorities' pressure on the organization, many students left the organization, particularly because they were constantly given "preventive talks" by law enforcement officers. Subsequently, the majority of the organization's participants became people over 25 years old.

Since 2016, Bashkort has been holding Congresses (Yiyyns) of the Bashkir people. The largest congress gathered more than 1,000 delegates.

Gabbasov became one of the most prominent Bashkir nationalists in the public space in 2015–2016. He organized rallies for the compulsory study of the Bashkir language in schools, organized information campaigns against the development of Mount Kushtau, as well as for the preservation of the Toratau mountain-shikhan ecosystem, advocated the introduction of quotas for officials of Bashkir nationality, and criticized the former head of the republic, Rustem Khamitov, including for his anti-Bashkir policy.

In 2019, the Prosecutor's Office of Bashkortostan issued a warning to "Bashkort" about the inadmissibility of extremist activities. At the end of January, the prosecutor's office filed a lawsuit against the organization. The prosecutor's office accused the organization of including Fanzil Akhmetshin, Sagit Ismagilov and Airat Dilmukhametov, who were convicted of extremism (Ismagilov's sentence was overturned), among the leaders of "Bashkort". Bashkort was also accused of organizing mass gatherings calling for extremist activity.

In 2020, the Supreme Court of the republic banned Bashkort as an extremist organization. Gabbasov and his associates lost their appeal and cassation suits against the decision. In September 2021, Bashkort filed a lawsuit with the ECHR.

== Gabbasov after Bashkort ==
At the end of November 2021, Gabbasov and his family left the Russian Federation, first going to Turkey and then to Vilnius, where he asked for political asylum and spoke at the "Free Russia Forum" (an event organized by oppositionist Garry Kasparov), namely at the panel "National or multi-ethnic Russia - self-determination of Russians and other peoples of the Russian Federation".

In early 2022, Gabbasov organized the "Bashkir National Political Center".

On February 7, 2022, the "Project of the State Structure of Bashkortostan" was presented, which, according to the developers of the document, "outlined the basic principles of the future renewed republic". The "Project" declared, among other things, that "the Republic of Bashkortostan" was created as a result of the Bashkir people's realization of their right to self-determination and is a state for all its citizens, who together form the People of Bashkortostan - the Bashkir Political Nation.

== Political Asylum in Lithuania ==
In 2021, Gabbasov fled to Lithuania and sought political asylum. In April 2022, Gabbasov was granted political asylum in Lithuania.

In May 2022, Gabbasov co-initiated the "League of Free Nations".

In September 2022, Bashkiria's Interior Ministry opened an extremism case against Gabbasov.

On October 21, 2022, the day after the Bashkir Resistance Committee announced the beginning of the guerrilla struggle on the territory of Bashkiria, Gabbasov was declared a foreign agent.

In October 2023 Gabbasov took part in the VIII Free Nations of Post-Russia Forum.

In 2023, Gabbasov's half-brother Rustam Fararetdinov was arrested in Bashkortostan, accused of "assisting terrorist activities". The searches were carried out by FSB officers, and Fararetdinov's wife was told that he would "sit for his brother".

In 2024, Gabbasov published the first volume of his book titled "Notes of a Bashkir Nationalist. Kuk Bure." Gabbasov plans to title the second volume "Notes of a Bashkir Nationalist. BOO Bashkort."

== Russian Sabotage and Murder Plots ==
In the Spring of 2025, a tracking device was found under the hood of Gabbasov's car. Lithuanian police started the investigation on this matter. In May 2026, Lithuanian police arrested nine people accused of plotting murders and sabotage across Europe at the behest of Russia’s military intelligence service, G.R.U. The The group set fire to military equipment in Bulgaria that was destined for Ukraine and carried out surveillance of Greek military installations, according to a statement released by the Lithuanian police.

== See also ==
- Free Russia Forum
- Free Nations of Post-Russia Forum
- Separatism in Russia
- National Liberation Struggle of the Bashkir People
- Fail Alsynov
- 2024 Bashkortostan protests
