= Ministry of Internal Affairs (Bashkortostan) =

Министерство внутренних дел по Республике Башкортостан Bashkortostan's Interior Ministry
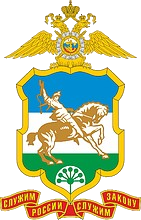
- Motto: служа закону, Служим народу By serving the law, we serve the people

Jurisdictional structure
- Operations jurisdiction: Russia
- General nature: Local civilian police

Operational structure
- Headquarters: Ufa, 7 Lenin Street
- Elected officer responsible: Mikhail Zakomaldin, Interior Minister

Website
- Official Site

Ministry of Internal Affairs of Bashkortostan or just The Police of Bashkortostan (Министерство внутренних дел по Республике Башкортостан - полиции Башкортостана) is the interior ministry of Bashkortostan in Russia.

The current Minister is Mikhail Zakomaldin (Since 2011).

== Structure ==
- The Unit for combating the Organized crime (Подразделение по борьбе с организованной преступностью)
- Directorate of Tax Crimes (Управление по налоговым преступлениям)
- Regional Dogs Center (Зональный центр кинологической службы)
- Traffic Police (Управление государственной инспекции безопасности дорожного движения)
- Direction for Private Protection(Управление вневедомственной охраны)
- Personnel Directorate (Управление по работе с личным составом)
- Professional Training Center (Центр профессиональной подготовки)
- The Ufa Law Institute of MVD (Уфимский юридический институт МВД России)

=== Regional Divisions ===
- Ufa City Police Department (Управление внутренних дел г.Уфы)
  - Ufa City Traffic Police (Полк ДПС ГAI при УВД г.Уфы)
  - 1st Police Department - Dem Region (Отдел полиции No.1 - Демский район)
  - 2nd Police Department - Kalinin Region (Отдел полиции No.2 - Калининский район)
  - 3rd Police Department - Kirov Region (Отдел полиции No.3 - Кировский район)
  - 4th Police Department - Lenin Region (Отдел полиции No.4 - Ленинский район)
  - 5th Police Department - Ordzhonikidze Region (Отдел полиции No.5 - Орджоникидзевский район)
  - 6th Police Department - October Region (Отдел полиции No.6 - Октябрьский район)
  - 7th Police Department - Soviet Region (Отдел полиции No.7 - Советский район)
- Neftekamsk City Police Directorate (УВД по г. Нефтекамск)
- Salavat City Police Directorate (УВД по городу Салават)
- Strelitamak City Police Directorate (УВД по городу Стерлитамак)
- Agidel City Police Department (ОВД по городу Агидель)
- Kumertau City Police Department (ОВД по городу Кумертау)
- Oktyabersky City Police Department (ОВД по городу Октябрьский)
- Sibai Town Police Department (ОВД по городу Сибай)
- Baimak City and Region Police Department (ОВД по Баймакскому району и городу Баймак)
- Belebay City and Region Police Department (ОВД по Белебеевскому району и городу Белебей)
- Beloretsk City and Region Police Directorate (УВД по Белорецкому району и городу Белорецк)
- Birsk City and Region Police Department (ОВД по Бирскому району и городу Бирск)
- Blagoveshchensk City and Region Police Department (ОВД по Благовещенскому району и г. Благовещенск)
- Davlekanovo City and Region Police Department (ОВД по Давлекановскому району и г. Давлеканово)
- Diurtul City and Region Police Department (ОВД по Дюртюлинскому району и г. Дюртюли)
- Ishimbai City and Region Police Department (ОВД по Ишимбайскому району и городу Ишимбай)
- Meleuoz City and Region Police Department (ОВД по Мелеузовскому району и городу Мелеуз)
- Tuimaz City and Region Police Department (ОВД по Туймазинскому району и городу)
- Uchaly City and Region Police Department (ОВД по Учалинскому району и городу Учалы)
- Yanaul City and Region Police Department (ОВД по Янаульскому району и г. Янаул)

== Interior Ministries ==
Interior People's Commissars

- Fatykh Tukhvtullin (1919–1920)
- Semyon Lobov (1920)
- Ivan Kashirin (1920–1921)
- Alexey Pirozhnikov (1921)
- Abdullah Adigamov (April–June 1921)
- Ahmed-Yasaviy Gumerov (1921–1922)
- Nikolay Sokolov (1922–1923)
- Shagit Khudaiberdin (1923–1924)
- Ismahil Sultaov (1925–1927)
- Shakir Abdullov (1927–1929)
- Shaikhiy Kharrasov (1929–1930)
- Nabiulla Bairamgulov (1930)
- Matvey Pogrebinsky (1930–1933)
- Nakhum Zelikman (1933–1937)
- German Lupekin (1937)
- Solomon Bak (April–October 1937)
- Alexander Medvedev (1937–1939)
- Alexey Sokolov (1939–1941; 1941–1943)
- Ivan Kudryakov) (1941)
- Dmitry Babenko (1943–1949)
- Condratiy Firsanov (1949–1954)

Interior Ministers

- Pavel Matveevsky (1954)
- Ivan Kojin (1954–1962)
- Vladimir Rylenko (1962–1987)
- Fyodor Semiletov (1987–1990)
- Anas Khasanov (1991–1995)
- Raul Fairuzov (1995–1996)
- Raphael Divaev (1996–2008)
- Mikhail Zakomaldin (Since 2011)
