= Ust-Kan =

Ust-Kan (Russian: Усть-Кан) is the name of several rural localities in Russia:

- Ust-Kan, Altai Republic, a selo in Ust-Kanskoye Rural Settlement of Ust-Kansky District of the Altai Republic
- Ust-Kan, Krasnoyarsk Krai, a selo in Kononovsky Selsoviet of Sukhobuzimsky District of Krasnoyarsk Krai
