= Alexander Pryadko =

- Александр Прядко

Minister of Internal Affairs of the Republic of Bashkortostan
- Incumbent
- Assumed office 6 March 2023
- Preceded by: Roman Deyev

Personal details
- Born: March 28, 1964 (age 62) Korkino, Chelyabinsk Oblast, RSFSR, Soviet Union
- Education: Rostov Law Institute

Alexander Alexandrovich Pryadko (Russian: Александр Александрович Прядко; Bashkir: Александр Александр улы Прядко, romanized: Aleksandr Aleksandr ulı Pryadko; born 28 March 1964) is a Russian internal affairs officer, police major-general and head of the Ministry of Internal Affairs of the Republic of Bashkortostan since March 6, 2023. He was also the Head of the Main Department of the Ministry of Internal Affairs of Arkhangelsk Oblast between 2019 and 2022 and deputy head of the Main Department for Samara Oblast between 2018 and 2019.
