= Soloti =

Soloti Солоти
- Selo
- Location within Belgorod Oblast Location within Russia
- Coordinates: 50°16′N 38°02′E
- Country: Russia
- Region: Belgorod Oblast
- District: Valuysky District
- Time zone: UTC+3:00

Soloti (Russian: Солоти) is a rural locality (a selo) in Valuysky District, Belgorod Oblast, Russia. The population was 736 as of 2010. There are 24 streets.

== History ==
On 15 October 2022, at roughly 10:00 UTC+3, a mass shooting occurred on a training ground near Soloti by two perpetrators. 13 deaths were reported, including the perpetrators, and another 15 were wounded.

== Geography ==
Soloti is located 11 km (6.8 mi) northwest of Valuyki (the district's administrative centre) by road. Timonovo is the nearest rural locality.
