= Fail Alsynov =

Bashkir activist (born 1986)

- Фаил Алсынов (Bashkir)
- Born: 7 December 1986 (age 39); Yuldybayevo, Bashkir ASSR, Russian SFSR, Soviet Union
- Citizenship: Russia
- Education: Bashkir State University
- Occupations: Activist, public figure

Fail Fattakhovich Alsynov (Bashkir: Фаил Фәттәх улы Алсынов, romanized: Fail Fättäx ulı Alsınov; Russian: Фаиль Фаттахович Алсынов; born 7 December 1986) is a Bashkir nationalist and local political activist known for his advocacy for nature protection, ethnic identity, and language preservation in Bashkortostan. In January 2024, his four-year prison sentence triggered widespread protests in the town of Baymak, drawing the participation of several thousand people.

== Early life ==
Born on 7 December 1986 in the village of Yuldybaevo, Alsynov pursued his education in the field of history at Bashkir State University.

== Activism ==
Commencing his activism in 2008, Alsynov swiftly emerged as a key figure in nature protection demonstrations within the Republic of Bashkortostan. Besides his environmental advocacy, he is renowned as one of the leading proponents for safeguarding the Bashkir language and preserving the cultural heritage of the Bashkir people.

Alsynov gained notoriety through his 2020 campaign opposing limestone mining in Kushtau, a site held sacred by Bashkirs. This activism significantly boosted his recognition, particularly within Bashkir circles. As he vocally opposed the mining activities, his influence expanded, capturing the attention of a wider audience.

=== Opposition to Russian invasion of Ukraine ===
In response to the Russian invasion of Ukraine in 2022, Alsynov voiced strong criticism against the mobilization in Russia, emphasizing potential detriments to the Bashkir people. Specifically, in December 2022, Alsynov took to Russian social network VKontakte, characterizing the Kremlin's "partial" military mobilization as a "genocide of the Bashkir peoples". This post led to a $113 fine for Alsynov for violating Russia's wartime censorship laws.

Alsynov's viewpoint resonated with concerns that Russia might be deploying a disproportionate number of men from indigenous ethnic groups, including Bashkirs, to fight in the war against Ukraine.

== Criminal prosecution ==
In April 2023, Alsynov actively participated in protests against illegal mining in the Baymaksky district, delivering a speech that would later become the foundation for the criminal case against him. In a complaint personally lodged by Radiy Khabirov, the head of Bashkortostan, authorities alleged that during the protest, Alsynov made disparaging remarks about migrant workers from the Caucasus and Central Asia, accusing him of "violating" their "human dignity" by referring to them as "black people".

Alsynov vehemently denied these charges, asserting that his speech had been mistranslated from the Bashkir language by a linguistic expert affiliated with the government. According to Alsynov, the linguistic misinterpretation significantly distorted the intended meaning of his statements. An anonymous independent linguistic assessment published by his supporters confirmed that the idiom “kara halyk” used by Alsynov is used in Bashkir and other Turkic languages to refer to “groups of people engaged in unskilled, hard labor.”

Furthermore, Alsynov stated that he did not suggest that non-Bashkirs had no right to live or work in the republic. Instead, he emphasized he meant that Bashkirs must protect their native lands, as it constituted their only place of residence. This clarification aimed to provide context to his statements and challenge the interpretation presented by the authorities, forming a crucial part of his defense.

=== Arrest and protests ===
On 17 January 2024, Alsynov was sentenced to a four-year prison term, triggering protests outside the court building in the town of Baymak where the proceedings took place. With an estimated 3,000 participants demonstrating against Alsynov's sentence, these protests marked one of the largest public gatherings in Russia since the onset of its invasion of Ukraine.

Police deployed tear gas to disperse the demonstrators, causing injuries to 40 protesters. Six people were jailed.

== See also ==
- Opposition to Vladimir Putin in Russia
- Separatism in Russia
