= 2026 Penza Oblast mobilisation =

Forced conscription events during the Russo-Ukrainian war

Penza Oblast in European Russia

Mobilisation in Penza Oblast is a phenomenon of forced mobilisation of civilians to join the Russia's war against Ukraine, reported since mid-June 2026 in the Penza Oblast of the Russian Federation.

In mid-June 2026, anti-war groups and exiled media reports from Penza Oblast described large-scale operations in which military commissariats, including Russian security forces, police officers and military enlistment officers, conducted street detentions and door-to-door sweeps, and pressured individuals, including people with debts or under administrative supervision, to sign military contracts with the Russian Ministry of Defence. Tentative early conclusions suggest that the raids in Penza Oblast effecting the abduction of numerous men into the military was an experiment to test how a new forced general mobilisation could potentially be launched throughout the Russian Federation at a future date, how much civilian resistance was to be expected, and how to suppress it.

== Eyewitness, local, social and exiled Russian media reports ==
=== Earliest reports ===
In late May 2026, Penza outlet Novaya Alternativa reported that 61-year-old Penza resident Stanislav Vyaltsin was summoned to the military enlistment office on Skladskaya Street, where, according to his wife, he was suffocated with a bag until he agreed to sign a contract with the Ministry of Defence. It also covered the kidnapping of Sursk resident Vladimir Podkovyrkin, amongst other cases involving locals forcibly mobilised to fight against Ukraine.

=== 16–17 June Skladskaya Street viral video ===
External videos
- "Penza Authorities Forcibly Mobilizing Men Into Military". The Moscow Times. 19 June 2026.
- "Облава на мужчин в Пензе. Женщин попытались отбить их у силовиков" [Men rounded up in Penza: Women attempt to rescue them from security forces]. Телеканал Дождь (Dozhd' independent news channel) (in Russian). 19 June 2026.

A video filmed in Penza on the night of 16–17 June 2026, verified and geolocated by Mediazona to the military enlistment office for the Oktyabrsky and Zheleznodorozhny districts on 19 Skladskaya Street in Penza, shows Russian women crying, protesting and resisting as they accuse men in uniform of having physically assaulted their male relatives, who were taken away in a white minibus; the video went viral on social media shortly thereafter. The women can be seen and heard begging the soldiers not to take their relatives away to the war in Ukraine, as well as reviling and cursing the soldiers for not even giving the women five minutes to say goodbye to their loved ones. The woman filming asks the 18 seized men in the minibus: "Guys, tell me, did everyone sign a contract voluntarily?", to which one of them shakes his head, while all seized men remain silent. Several women surrounded and blocked the minibus, trying to prevent it from leaving, with some kicking and hitting the minibus, threatening to shatter the window.

One of the wives later told Mediazone that enlistment officers beat her husband and forced him to sign a contract, while his passport and bank cards were cancelled and he was issued new ones. The next day, 17 June, her husband called her saying he was already in Rostov-on-Don, and the day after in Mariupol in Russian-occupied Ukraine. Another woman told Radio Free Europe/Radio Liberty: "Of course, all of this looks like illegal coercion. My father had no intention of going to war; we discussed this with him. I see no explanation for this, other than threats, violence, or pressure."

=== Later reports and resistance ===
Mentioned towns in Penza Oblast

Similar to the viral video incident in Skladskaya Street, independent Telegram channel Astra reported that women at the military enlistment office in Kamenka on 17 June attempted to stop officials from taking men away in a minibus.

On 18 June, the National Guard of Russia announced they were going to perform a raid to find draft registration violators, after which the police stopped dozens of vehicles and checked 80 people, of which nine were subsequently summoned to register.

"He said they had been beaten. Beaten terribly. Right there at the military enlistment office. They had beaten those signatures out of them – his fingers were already broken, so he practically had to draw a cross. Anya [his wife] is wailing terribly. But there is nothing she can do about it. There is no money for a lawyer. And we can see that lawyers are not helping anyway. They are just brazenly stealing these men away." (Note: "Сказал, что били. Страшно били. Прямо в военкомате. Из них выколачивали эти подписи – пальцы уже были перебиты, он ставил чуть ли не крестик. Аня воет страшно. А поделать ничего не может. Денег на адвоката нет. Да и мы видим, что адвокаты не помогают. Мужиков просто внаглую воруют, – говорит Арина.")

— "Arina" (about her sister-in-law's husband's abduction from Kamenka on 18 June 2026)

By 19 June 2026, The Moscow Times reported that several people from Penza city and surrounding towns (including Kamenka and Kuznetsk) contacted Idite Lesom ("Get Lost", a non-profit organisation that helps Russian men avoid military service) with reports of "men being rounded up indiscriminately". The same day, door-to-door abductions were also reported in Spassk, where one woman dubbed "Arina" described how the authorities kicked down the door of her neighbour Sergei when he refused to show his documents, and took him away in a minivan waiting outside. Arina also told how her sister-in-law's husband "Alexey" was abducted from his home in Kamenka on 18 June, with the excuse that he was late in paying loan debts; after his children and wife tried to hold on to him, the authorities "wrenched his arm, kicked off the children, and dragged him out of the house" to the recruitment office. Not until 23 June was he able to contact his wife again, when he was already in Rostov-on-Don, telling her how he and other men had been severely beaten at the enlistment office continuously until they signed a contract. Round-ups were later also reported in Serdobsk and Nizhny Lomov.

On 20 June, a 3-minute video was filmed in Kuznetsk of a disabled Russian veteran in a wheelchair who had lost his legs during the war in Ukraine, and was now threatening military enlistment officers with a kitchen knife while shouting and cursing at them, demanding that they do not take away more men to the war. Amongst other things, he was quoted as saying: "Get the f**k out of here, you f**kers. Mothers don't have any children left, you bastards! What are you going to tell mothers then?"

A video published on 24 June (which has since been deleted, but copies have been preserved) shows how at the Bekovsky Sugar Factory, dozens of colleagues defended a man whom the police tried to abducted. The angry factory workers chased away a civilian recruiter, claiming he had no legal orders, and shouting "Get out of here!" and "Bloody bastard!" at him, while a police officer silently stood by doing nothing. Authorities later said a mistake had been made, and the police never meant to "detain a citizen for transport to the special military operations zone" (Ukraine).

Radio Svoboda reported on 26 June that abductions of men in Penza Oblast were continuing, while also reporting some abductions in Primorsky Krai and Khabarovsk Krai, with the same patterns of men being detained in the streets, beaten, and forced to sign contracts.

=== Patterns ===
According to witnesses and locals, law enforcement personnel (including traffic police, "men in balaclavas" and enlistment office staff) were stopping cars and public transportation, detaining men and taking them away. Many residents had the impression that the operation was targeting men indiscriminately. One post on social media purported that the "cops, together with the enlistment office," were driving around towns in minibuses, "stopping everyone and taking them away". An Idite Lesom subscriber was quoted as saying that in the Sputnik neighbourhood of Penza, police carried out a door-to-door sweep at people's homes: "They're grabbing absolutely everyone, stopping cars and public transport, men are being bundled off to sign a contract, there are raids all over the city." Locals trying to inform and warn each other gathered in a Telegram channel and chat group, which by 21 June had over 600 subscribers.

Other residents told exiled Russian media that the raids not necessarily targeted an indiscriminate grouping of men, but apparent "draft dodgers" who had ignored earlier mobilisation notices. One family filed a formal complaint alleging that a male relative was "tricked into signing a Defense Ministry contract under the guise of standard paperwork documenting his arrest." Idite Lesom reported that some of the targeted groups included men who had debts, suspended sentences and outstanding criminal records, making them easy targets for the police. Others include just a drunk person, whom police threatened to deprive of parental rights unless he signed a contract. Similarly, locals reported that military enlistment officers were deliberately waiting with black minibuses near liquor stores to "pick up drunks who are easy to force to sign something."

== Official Russian responses ==
=== Denials and downplaying ===
Several local media outlets associated with the Penza city authorities ignored the reports entirely, causing outrage amongst concerned local residents who said the raids were continuing. Pro-Kremlin media (including a "War on Fakes" post reposted by the official Ministry of Defence Telegram channel) dismissed the reports as "fake news", instead explaining the heavy presence of military and security forces in Penza Oblast as "routine law enforcement sweeps targeting undocumented migrants and standard draft evaders." "War on Fakes" claimed that the silence of the men taken into the minibus in the viral video proved that they showed "no sign of being there against their will".

Andrei Surkov, the Penza Oblast military commissar, responded to Mediazona, claiming the viral video of women crying about their male relatives being taken away was "staged". He called the female protesters in the video "three women who have nothing whatever to do with this business," commenting: "I assure you there are no roundups and nothing forcible, whatever all your media outlets claim. And I'll add: foreign-agent media," suggesting that the Mediazona reporter might be "a Ukrainian spy [working] for the SBU." Penza police officials, calling the reports of forced mobilisation in Penza Oblast "inaccurate", explained the raids as being aimed at "men who recently received Russian citizenship but failed to register at the local military recruitment office." The Penza Oblast Directorate of the Russian Ministry of Internal Affairs described the raids as "mass gatherings" (Russian: массовыми мероприятиями), and similarly claimed the target was "people who had taken Russian citizenship but failed to register for military service on time." The Directorate denied anyone was forced to sign a contract.

=== Intimidation against reporters and civilians ===
Local vlogger Stanislav Morozov made a video about the forced mobilisation in Penza, in which he called the military enlistment office at Skladskaya Street a "torture camp." Amongst other things, he claimed that active resistance against the raiding authorities was already happening, saying: "The Penza bastards who force people to sign contracts under torture have started to be beaten in the streets," and also claimed that a taxi driver taking people to the military registration and enlistment office had been killed. He called on Penza residents to unite and resist the military enlistment officers, saying people should "organise", and that they "know what to do". On 19 June, the police filed an administrative charge against Morozov, according to Mediazona for "abuse of freedom of the mass media". Radio Svoboda reported that there were two charges drawn up against Morozov, one for insulting the authorities, and the second for what he said about the military enlistment office. Morozov responded that nothing showed in the videos was fake, but accurate, and that he would fight against the charges in court.

On 21 June, Meduza reported that the Penza city police issued a statement warning anyone against spreading "fake news" about forced mobilisation in Penza. The police said that over the previous past few days, "fake" reports had been spreading online about "numerous detentions of men by police officers for dispatch to the zone of the Special Military Operation". The Interior Ministry directorate claimed that the Penza police were working as usual, but reports about forced mobilisation had caused "this situation [to be] blown up out of proportion", and in turn that supposedly had led to a "surge in crime and impunity". People documenting and spreading reports about the detention of men could face legal consequences: "individuals spreading inaccurate information will be held accountable."

On 1 July 2026, local blogger Stanislav Morozov was detained by the police, informed that the FSB had opened a criminal case against him for "inciting extremism online", and then released on bail. During the FSB interrogation, Morozov was forced to admit guilt, and the FSB said they knew he had plans to leave for Armenia.

== Analysis ==
=== Motivation ===
After the so-called "partial mobilisation" was launched throughout Russia in September 2022, largely but not exclusively targeting reservists, this caused shock, protest and resistance in many parts of the country. Ever since, the Kremlin sought to replenish its massive casualties in Ukraine through attracting volunteers by ever higher-paying contracts, but that option appeared to wear off by the end of 2025. In December 2025, Russian legislation was amended to allow conscription procedures to be conducted throughout the year beginning in 2026, replacing the previous system of seasonal conscription campaigns. This and other signs prompted analysts and commentators to increasingly suggest that the Russian government might call a second mass mobilisation, perhaps in autumn 2026, to make up for its worsening personnel shortages. Various more coercive instruments were already being employed, such as forcing "conscripts into signing contracts just months into their first year of mandatory service", or forging signatures on volunteer contracts. In late May 2026, the Institute for the Study of War (ISW) concluded that the Russian military was facing deep personnel shortages and training problems, but contract recruitment was continuing to decline, and even forced mobilisation would not significantly improve Russia's position in the Ukrainian battlefield.

=== Tactics ===
In the mid-2026 Penza Oblast forced mobilisation raids, success seemed to depend very much on the quickness of the operation. A man had to be snatched away before his relatives and friends had time to find out, protest and resist his abduction. Human rights activists reported that some relatives of the detained men were successful in rescuing them when they acted quickly, while other men were forced to sign contracts and taken away, often already before their relatives were able to find out where they were, why, and arrive to verify whether they had voluntarily signed a military contract or not, and to protest and resist. One mother in Kamenka spent several days outside the Penza enlistment office, so far failing to find her son, who had reportedly been abducted off the street. "This is outrageous. People are basically being kidnapped. Something needs to be done, but I don't know what," she was quoted as saying. Another woman's son was detained and taken to the enlistnment office without any documents, but paperwork to send him to Ukraine was processed within an hour. She concluded he had been beaten and forced to sign a contract, as he never intended to go to war.

A lawyer from the Conscientious Objectors NGO said the stories of forcible abductions based on flimsy excuses were nothing new, but the scope of the Penza Oblast detention raids and the outcry from relatives of the men taken away was unprecedentedly large. "Often you don't need to beat or torture a person. It's enough to just intimidate them with the potential consequences for themselves or their families. People are under intense psychological pressure and make decisions out of fear," the lawyer added.

A 53-year-old man was taken off the street from Penza after returning from work late, after which his family tried finding him for three weeks before he contacted them from Rostov-on-Don. A relative of him told Radio Liberty: "He's in shock, of course, and we're all in shock here. It's simply dangerous for men to walk the streets in Penza right now. Doesn't matter if you're elderly, sober, or have documents; anyone can be grabbed."

=== Rationale for Penza Oblast ===
It is unclear why Penza Oblast specifically was chosen for this operation of forced mobilisation, which was not simultaneously widely observed in other oblasts or republics of the Russian Federation. Residents in the region were not particularly trusting of the local authorities, and there was a sufficient number of independent local media outlets and social media channels able and willing to document what was happening, and warn both their fellow citizens and the outside world of that it was happening. Sporadically, rights activists noted some abductions in other oblasts, including 26-year-old Yaroslav Kubov in Vladivostok, who on 9 June was grabbed off the street by two unfamiliar men in civilian clothing after he refused their invitation to drink a beer. Kubov was put in a vehicle, driven out of town, beaten and yelled at, given a new passport and military identity card, and sent to Rostov-on-Don, where he was able to contact his relatives only five days after he had been abducted.

On the other hand, Mediazona confirmed that raids on draft dodgers had happened in Penza Oblast before in August 2025, while raids on people who recently acquired Russian citizenship had also been reported in Penza Oblast in April 2025. According to Idite Lesom, the Penza draft raids looked roughly similar to what happened in Makhachkala in June 2025, "when all the men who looked like men of draft age were simply put on these buses. Now, roughly the same practice is happening in Penza on a slightly larger scale." Meanwhile, Radio Svoboda reported on 21 June that "representatives of the mobilisation structures of the Southern Federal District" were holding training sessions in Volgograd Oblast to prepare for mobilisation, which organisers said was "a peace-time process, and ongoing".

On 21 June, based on the information shared in Russian Telegram groups, Ukrainian military vlogger Denys Davydov concluded: "I think local authorities are checking the reaction of Russians themselves. If they swallow it, well, in this case, there will be a forced mobilisation in multiple other Russian regions." On 26 June 2026, the Foreign Intelligence Service of Ukraine issued a statement similarly saying that the Kremlin was using this operation in Penza Oblast as the main testing ground for an experiment of a quick and quiet forced mobilisation of random men in the street. As the Russian military was desperately looking for more recruits to address its personnel shortages, but Russian federal authorities feared that an official announcement of a forced mobilisation in the entire country to fight in Ukraine would spark an open revolt against the Russian government, new tactics had to be tested somewhere on a smaller scale first.

On 2 July, Penza blogger Morozov similarly told Astra: "I share the opinion, which is currently being actively spread online, that Penza was the site of an experiment, which turned out to be a disaster... It's scary to go outside in Penza, especially in the evening. Whoever you meet, someone's friend or relative is sure to have been kidnapped".

== See also ==
- 2022 Russian mobilization
- 2022 North Caucasian protests
- 2022 Russian Far East protests
- Russian military commissariats attacks
