= Bereslavka =

Bereslavka may refer to the following places:

- Bereslavka, Kazakhstan, a village in the Aiyrtau District, North Kazakhstan Region
- Bereslavka, Russia, a village in Kalachyovsky District, Volgograd Oblast
- Bereslavka, Ukraine, a village in the Bobrynets Raion, Kirovohrad Oblast
