= 2022 mobilization in the Donetsk People's Republic and the Luhansk People's Republic =

Troop readying in Ukrainian oblasts

The general mobilization in the Donetsk People's Republic and the Luhansk People's Republic began on 19 February 2022, 5 days before the start of Russia's full-scale invasion of Ukraine. Tens of thousands of local residents were forcibly mobilized for the war (according to one estimate, up to 140,000 people as of mid-June 2022).

The mobilization was accompanied by mass raids on men of military age. In the enterprises of the region, up to 80% of employees were called up, which led to the shutdown of mines and public transport, resulting in the paralysis of city and public services. To avoid mobilization, residents are forced to hide or try to leave the republics.

The mobilization revealed numerous problems with the armed forces of the DPR and LPR. Recruits without training and combat experience found themselves on the front lines without adequate supplies: the units lack uniforms, weapons, food, and medicines. One human rights activist reported a huge death toll among mobilized recruits in clashes with the Armed Forces of Ukraine.

== History ==
=== Previous events ===
Mobilization in the DPR and LPR was announced after the aggravation of the situation on the line of contact in mid-February – 5 days before the start of a full-scale Russian invasion of Ukraine. The chain of events began on 15 February 2022, when the State Duma of the Russian Federation supported appeals to the president for immediate recognition of the self-proclaimed Donetsk and Luhansk republics to ensure "protection against external threats."

On 16 February, NATO Secretary General Jens Stoltenberg said that despite public statements about the withdrawal of troops, Russia is building up a grouping on the border with Ukraine. Starting in the evening of the same day, the OSCE Special Monitoring Mission to Ukraine recorded a multiple increase in the number of explosions in the area of the line of contact. At a meeting of the UN Security Council on 17 February, US Secretary of State Antony Blinken said that Russia was preparing a subtext for an attack on Ukraine, and the next day, US President Joe Biden suggested that Vladimir Putin had decided to start a war and invade Ukraine in the coming days.

On the evening of 18 February, the authorities of the DPR and LPR published appeals by Denis Pushilin and Leonid Pasechnik, who announced the mass evacuation of civilians to Russia due to the allegedly expected invasion of the Ukrainian Armed Forces into territories not controlled by Ukraine at any moment. Investigators from Bellingcat noted that the appeals were actually recorded on 16 February – even before the escalation began. At the same time, Pushilin himself focuses on the date on the video recording: “from today, 18 February. The next day, 19 February, general mobilization was announced in both republics, and men aged 18–55 were forbidden to leave the DPR and LPR.

=== Armed formations ===
The Minsk agreements signed in 2015 contained clauses on the withdrawal of all foreign armed formations and military equipment, as well as the "disarmament of all illegal groups" in the Donetsk and Luhansk regions. The DPR and LPR had their own armed forces – the so-called "people's militias", which were armed with heavy armored vehicles and artillery. The journalists noted that the Russian military was engaged in their creation, and the Ukrainian authorities even called them Russian army corps under the command of the leadership of the Southern Military District and emphasized that the "people's militia" had a structure, charters and uniforms identical to those in the Russian army.

In the absence of conscription for military service in the DPR and LPR in 2015–2022, the "people's militias" were formed on a contract basis. On 29 January 2015, the chief of Ukraine's General Military Staff Viktor Muzhenko said 'the Ukrainian army is not engaged in combat operations against Russian regular units,' but that he had information about Russian civilian and military individuals fighting alongside 'illegal armed groups in combat activities.' According to the RAND Corporation, "Russia has armed, trained, and led the separatist forces. But even by Kyiv's own estimates, the vast majority of rebel forces consist of locals—not soldiers of the regular Russian military." As of February 2018, the number of separatist forces were estimated at 31,000 out of which 80% (25,000) were Donbas residents, 15% (≈5,000) were military contractors from Russia and other countries and 3% (900–1,000) were regular Russian armed forces personnel. According to Ukrainian intelligence, up to a quarter of the personnel were regular Russian military, 40% were "volunteers" from Russia. BBC journalists noted that those who could not sign a contract in their homeland due to criminal records or debts were accepted into the armed formations of the DPR and LPR. However, neither independent journalists nor employees of the Russian state media had detailed information about what was happening in the armed forces of the republics.

Meduza's interlocutor, who is connected with the DPR authorities, lamented that the need for mass mobilization arose due to large-scale corruption and a two-fold overestimation of the recruitment of military formations. The theft of funds allocated for the formation of an army reserve in the DPR and LPR was reported by the Eastern Human Rights Group, which protects the rights of illegally mobilized in the Donbas.

=== Start of mobilization ===
After the announcement of mobilization, those liable for military service received an order to urgently arrive at mobilization points, regardless of whether they received a summons. Men aged 18–55 were forbidden to leave the territories of the DPR and LPR. Voluntary mobilization was announced for men over 55 years of age (later, the recruitment of volunteers over 65 years of age into special units of the local Ministry of the Interior was allowed). The authorities of the republics launched a widespread propaganda campaign calling for the fulfillment of the "sacred duty of a man" and threats of criminal liability for deviationists.

Three days after the start of mobilization, by decrees of the heads of the DPR and LPR, compulsory conscription was extended to all men aged 18–27, regardless of military experience. Public and private enterprises were ordered to provide lists of military-age employees for mobilization.

== Progress of mobilization ==
According to the Eastern Human Rights Group, as of mid-June, about 140,000 people were forcibly mobilized in the DPR and LPR, of which from 48,000 to 96,000 were sent to the front, and the rest to logistics support.

A few days after the announcement of mobilization, patrols appeared on the streets of cities, which detained men of military age. The raids took place in houses, on the streets, in shops, markets, and on public transport. Hiding from mobilization, men in the DPR and LPR change addresses, do not leave their apartments, and share their experience of draft evasion in social networks and chats. According to local residents, the streets are empty, and Donetsk has turned into a "city of women".

The only legal way to avoid mobilization in the DPR and LPR is a "reservation" from an employer or educational institution, however, there are cases of conscripting people without regard for its presence. Among the illegal methods are bribing patrolmen on the street to avoid being taken to the military registration and enlistment office, for leaving the territory of Russia (about 100 thousand rubles) or sending them to the rear services (from 1 thousand dollars). Holders of Russian passports who until February 2022 were issued under a simplified procedure for two months are not subject to mobilization.

In fact, there are no mechanisms for protecting the rights of forcibly mobilized in the republics. Russian officials, contacted by relatives of those sent to the armed forces, refuse to intervene, referring to the recognition of the independence of the DPR and LPR.

=== Mobilization of those unfit for military service ===
It is known that forced mobilization in the DPR and LPR also affected people who were unfit for military service for health reasons – having serious or chronic diseases. The BBC reported on the case of the call-up of a group of students, among whom were those suffering from congenital heart defects and epilepsy. In June, a statement from soldiers of the DPR mobilization reserve got into the public field, in which the soldiers spoke about the presence among them of people with pyelonephritis, progressive thrombophlebitis, and cirrhosis, and one of the mobilized admitted that he had a mental disorder. Journalists also recorded stories about people sent to the front with vision problems, hernia and varices, as well as attempts to re-mobilize those who were treated after being wounded at the front.

=== Supply issues ===
Mass mobilization revealed critical supply problems in the armed forces of the unrecognized republics. According to relatives of those sent to the front, the military units do not have enough equipment – thermal underwear, berets, unloading vests, and uniforms in size. Often soldiers are forced to buy them on their own, which takes all combat payments. In the photos from the front line, published by Igor Girkin, a participant in the war in the Donbas of 2014–2015, the soldiers wear helmets of the 1968 model, pouches of the 1970s, are armed with Mosin rifles of the 1891/1944 model and Sudaev submachine guns of 1944 production. With reference to local residents, journalists reported on the lack of medicines, food, and the simplest personal hygiene products – all this is bought and sent to the front by relatives of the mobilized.

=== Sending outside the DPR and LPR ===
Despite the fact that the mobilization was carried out under the pretext of protecting the DNR and LNR from the Ukrainian invasion, after several days of drill training, many mobilized were sent outside the region to participate in combined arms operations in the Kharkiv, Sumy, Zaporizhzhia and Mykolaiv Oblasts. According to the statements of conscripts and their relatives, they often performed the most difficult and primitive work, and in some cases, recruits from the DPR and LPR were used as "cannon fodder". Also, the relatives of the mobilized have repeatedly reported that regular Russian military personnel left those in positions during the retreat. Presumably, this happened to the 206th Regiment of the People's Militia of the LPR in the Kharkiv region and led to women's protests in Luhansk demanding a meeting with the head of the republic.

== Aftermath ==
=== Losses ===
As Radio Liberty reported, due to the huge number of dead and missing in Donetsk and Makiivka, local residents call the mobilization “mogilization (grave-ization)”. Most of the mobilized have no combat experience and hold weapons for the first time, which is why the formations of the DPR and LPR suffer heavy losses. According to the British Ministry of Defense, based on official data from the DPR authorities, the forces of the unrecognized republic lost up to half of their personnel, including those mobilized after the start of the invasion. As of June 2022, DPR officials reported more than 2,200 killed and over 8,000 wounded. Der Spiegel reported that forcibly recruited men from Donbas were used as cannon fodder. According to DPR officials, more than 3,000 were killed and over 13,000 wounded, "a casualty rate of 80 percent of the initial fighting force." In the "Eastern Human Rights Group", involved in helping the mobilized, the death toll in both republics was estimated at 30,000 people at the end of August 2022.

=== Business shutdown ===
By order of the local authorities, DPR enterprises were obliged to provide half of the draft-age workers for mobilization, but in practice, up to 80% of the staff were sent to military service. There are cases (for example, at the Southern Mining and Metallurgical Plant in Yenakiieve) when workers were called up despite the presence of reservations from the employer. At most agricultural enterprises in the region, 100% of agronomists, tractor drivers, machine operators, and mechanics received subpoenas, which jeopardized the sowing season.

Mobilization paralyzed the work of city and municipal services, local administrations, public transport, markets and shops, infrastructure enterprises, and mines. Employees of state-owned enterprises went into the first wave of mobilization. The entire male staff of the Donetsk and Luhansk Philharmonics was called to the front. Musicians from Luhansk became the heroes of a documentary video by the Russian rap artist Husky with the participation of the singer Yulia Chicherina.

=== Risk of mining problems ===
After the start of mobilization, 27 mines that remained after 2014–2015 in the territories controlled by the DPR and LPR went into idle time due to a lack of workers. Since the outbreak of hostilities, Ukraine became unable to participate in the maintenance of mines and the pumping out of mine waters. These events created the risk of a man-made problem in the region.

First, mine water contains a large amount of sulfates, chlorides, and manganese salts. Mixed with groundwater, they can make fresh water sources unfit for drinking after rising to the surface. They can also erode and make the soil unstable, which could lead to the collapse of houses. Additionally, the release of methane from mine workings could result in the accumulation of methane in explosive concentrations in the basements of houses.

=== Protests against mobilization ===
Protests against the mobilization took place but quickly stopped under pressure from law enforcement agencies. So in mid-May, the wives of the soldiers of the 206th People's Militia Regiment went to a rally and demanded a meeting with the head of the republic, Leonid Pasechnik. According to them, the Russian military left their husbands on the front line during the retreat in the Kharkiv Oblast. The leadership of the republic ignored the demands of the women. The Russian television channel NTV illustrated a story about the spread of "fake news" by a girl allegedly recruited by the special services of Ukraine. At the same time, employees of the “Ministry of State Security” of the LPR began to put pressure on the participants in the chat rooms dedicated to the mobilization and look for those who were dissatisfied. This stopped any attempts to hold street actions in Luhansk.

== Legal assessment ==
Lawyers interviewed by Radio Liberty noted that from the point of view of international law, statements about the independence of the DPR and LPR are insignificant, as is the status of the passports of the "republics" issued to citizens of Ukraine in the occupied territories. By conducting forced mobilization, Russia directly violated Article 51 IV of the Geneva Convention for the Protection of Civilian Population in Time of War of 1949, which expressly prohibits forced service in the armed or auxiliary forces and propaganda of voluntary participation in the war on the side of the occupying country. Russia also violated Article 51 of the 1907 Hague Convention, which prohibits the involvement of civilians in activities related to the fight against the army of their native article. In accordance with Articles 146–147 IV of the Geneva Convention, forced mobilization is a serious violation of international humanitarian law and involves personal criminal liability for those involved. At the same time, according to Ukrainian laws, these crimes do not imply amnesty.

== See also ==
- 2022 Russian mobilization
