= Walkie (rapper) =

Russian rapper (1995–2022)

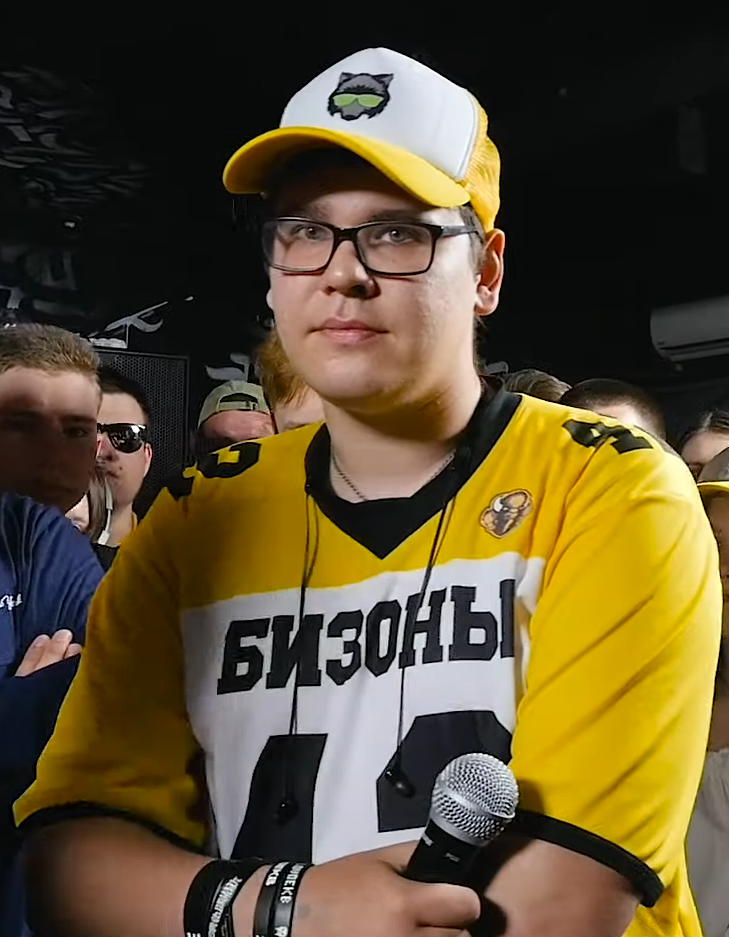
- Walkie in 2019
- Born: Ivan Vitalyevich Petunin; 24 May 1995; Belorechensk, Krasnodar Krai, Russia
- Died: 30 September 2022 (aged 27); Krasnodar, Russia
- Cause of death: Suicide by jumping from height
- Other name: Walkie T
- Occupation: Rapper
- Years active: 2012–2022

Ivan Vitalyevich Petunin (Russian: Иван Витальевич Петунин; 24 May 1995 – 30 September 2022), better known as Walkie (formerly Walkie T until 2015), was a Russian hip hop artist and battle rapper.

Petunin died by suicide following the 2022 Russian mobilization for the Russo-Ukrainian war, saying, in a video posted to Telegram, that he refuses to kill another man. He released an album before jumping from the 11th floor of a high-rise building in his hometown of Krasnodar.

== Biography ==
=== Early life ===
Inva Vitalyevich Petunin was born on 24 May 1995 in Belorechensk, Krasnodar Krai, Russia. He became interested in rap at the age of 14 after listening to Eminem and 2Pac. He began his first steps in his career back in 2012 at the Slovo battle site, where he battled until 2015. He then joined the army.

=== First popularity ===
After returning from the army in 2016, he moved to St. Petersburg and began to participate in rap battle at the site #SLOVOSPB. Walkie first got discussed after a fight with rapper Abbalbisk during a battle at the SLOVO: Moscow site. Later it turned out that the fight was staged. 2017 turned out to be the most productive year in Walkie's career. He released several albums and took part in dozens of battles, including some on Versus. During 2017, he also appeared in battles organized by SlovoSPB and the Russian Battle League, including matches against Mozee Montana, Re-Pac, and DEEP-EX-SENSE.

=== Health problems ===
Against the backdrop of great fatigue, Walkie channel subscribers began to notice his strange behavior, after which several more broadcasts were launched, where Petunin spoke incoherent phrases, jumping from topic to topic. After that, the rapper's wife and mother placed him in a psychiatric hospital for a month and a half, where he was diagnosed with mania and schizophrenia. After being discharged from the hospital, Petunin was taken home by his wife. He later jumped from the third floor of his flat, breaking his spine, and soon was taken to hospital. His wife ultimately left him because of his crazy actions, which further affected his conditions. Later, Walkie released an album about this tough period of his life, Wolves in a Psychiatric Hospital.

=== Death ===
On 30 September 2022, in his Telegram channel, Petunin released a suicide video where he said that because of the mobilization and the Russian invasion of Ukraine from which it stemmed, he had decided to commit suicide by jumping. He was 27. On the day of his death, he also released an album saying his goodbyes.

== Releases ==
=== Rap battles ===
2012

- Walkie T vs Toshi Tak-To (Loss)
- Walkie T vs Sano MC (Win)
- Walkie T vs Kolya Haight (Win)
- Peter Parker (Walkie T) vs Green Goblin (Dima KEX) (Loss)
- Walkie T vs KRK (Win)

2013

- Walkie T & .Otrix vs QcheR & Alr1ght (Loss)
- Walkie T vs Hassan (Loss)
- Walkie T vs Hyde (Win)
- Walkie T vs Lam (Win)
- Walkie T vs Ol Z (Win)
- Walkie T vs Vitya Chirkalo (Win)
- Walkie T vs Edya Elate (Loss)
- Walkie T vs Symba SLK (Win)
- Walkie T vs Dima KEX (Win)
- Walkie T vs Cuban

2014

- Walkie T vs Lonely Old Woman Hip-Hop (Win)
- Walkie T vs VoVaNo
- Walkie T vs Misha Boyara (Win)
- Walkie T & WahaBeat vs Despot & Takini (Win)
- Walkie T vs Dom1no (Draw)
- Walkie T vs Lazo (Win)
- Walkie T vs Nongratta (Win)

2015

- Walkie T vs. Otrix

2016

- Walkie vs El Loco (Loss)
- Walkie vs edik_kingsta (Win)
- Walkie vs Milky (Loss)
- Walkie vs Abbalbisk (Loss)
- Walkie vs Abbalbisk (Win)

2017

- Walkie vs DEEP-EX-SENSE (Loss)
- Walkie vs ΨBOY (Win)
- Walkie vs R1Fmabes (Loss)
- Walkie vs Re-Pac (Win)
- Walkie vs Vыktor Kolomoiskii
- Walkie vs Mozee Montana (Win)
- Walkie vs Bully "Prime" (Walkie) vs Abbalbisk (Loss)
- Walkie vs Dom1no (BPM)
- Walkie vs Shumm (Loss)

2018

- Walkie vs Prostitute's Son (Win)
- Walkie vs Sector (Draw)
- Walkie vs Shumm (Loss)

2019

- Walkie vs Edichka (Win)
- Walkie vs BionicleWalkie vs Yuki_NWalkie vs Puncher
- Walkie vs Guide CatWalkie vs Crowd (Loss)
- Walkie vs Solovey (Win)
- Walkie vs Plane Dead (Loss)
- Walkie vs Gokilla (Loss)

2020

- Walkie vs Vroom (BPM, Lost)
- Walkie vs Blizz4rd (Disqualified)
- Walkie vs Kepkin (Win)

2021

- Walkie vs KnownAim vs XXOS vs Corypheus vs Odinnadcatiy (Win)
- Walkie vs LeTai (Victory)
- Walkie vs Dictator UAV (Win)

2022

- Walkie vs Mixi
- Walkie vs Fukish with Hustle vs Chill (Loss)
- Walkie vs Smoke[PlanB] (Loss)
- Walkie vs Mixi vs Dictator UAV vs Abbalbisk vs Zhaba Arkadievna (Loss)
