= 2022 North Caucasian protests =

Anti-war and anti-mobilization protests

- Part of the Anti-war protests in Russia (2022–present) and 2022 Russian partisan movement
- Date: 21–30 September 2022
- Location: Northern Caucasus regions, Russia
- Caused by: Mobilization in Russia; Ramzan Kadyrov's rule in Chechnya
- Goals: Cancellation of mobilization in the regions of the North Caucasus
- Methods: Demonstrations; Internet activism; Civil disobedience; Clashes with police
- Result: Protests suppressed; Mobilization cancelled in Chechnya

Parties
(Russia) Government: Ministry of Defence; Ministry of Internal Affairs; Police; National Guard; National Guard Forces Command; OMON; SOBR; Government of Chechnya; Government of Dagestan; Government of Kabardino-Balkaria	Opposition: Dagestani National Movement; Anti-war activists; Adat People's Movement; (Circassia) Circassian nationalists

Lead figures
Vladimir Putin; Sergei Shoigu; Ramzan Kadyrov; Sergey Melikov; Kazbek Kokov	No centralized leadership

Casualties
- Detained: 100+ (25 September); 200+ (26 September)

With the beginning of mobilization in Russia, anti-war and anti-mobilization protests broke out in Chechnya, Dagestan and other regions of the Russian Caucasus.

On 25 September 2022, mass protests took place in the capital of Dagestan, Makhachkala, which ended in fights with the police and dispersal.

== History ==
Flag used in early anti-mobilization protests

Flag used in later protests and subsequent partisan movement

=== 21–22 September ===
On 21 September, in the capital of Chechnya, Grozny, on the day the mobilization was announced in Russia, several dozen women tried to hold a protest rally against it. All of them were detained. The action provoked an angry reaction from the head of Chechnya, Ramzan Kadyrov.

The next day, in Babayurt, the Republic of Dagestan, the federal highway was blocked at the exit from the village. Also, a group of villagers gathered near the local military registration and enlistment office, where there was a clash between them and an employee of the military registration and enlistment office.

The same day, women also protested in Baksan, Kabardino-Balkaria. They were crying and screaming.

=== 25–26 September ===
==== Endirey ====
On 25 September, residents of Endirey, Khasavyurtovsky District of Dagestan, took part in a rally against mobilization and blocked the Khasavyurt-Makhachkala federal highway. The reason for the protest was the mass mobilization, and not the partial mobilization promised by President Putin. It was planned to mobilize 110 people from a village with a population of 8,000, including those who had recently returned from the army.

The security forces fired into the air to stop the rally. About a hundred people gathered. After the speech of the military commissar, the protesters dispersed.

==== Nalchik ====
On the same day, a protest action – also with the participation of primarily women – was held in the Circassian-majority city of Nalchik, Kabardino-Balkaria. Five Circassian nationalists, Valery Khazhukov, Marks Shakhmurov, Aslan Beshto, Alik Shashev and Timur Alo issued a 1,250-word letter to the heads of the local republics to stop mobilization. Several dozens of local residents took to the rally in front of the government building. A rally was held, the following day. The protesters were joined by local officials. They refused to answer questions about how many people would be mobilized from the republic.

==== Makhachkala ====
The Telegram channels Morning Dagestan and 1ADAT acted as the initiators and coordinators of the rallies.

On the afternoon of September 25, people, mostly women, gathered for a protest in the center of Makhachkala. The protesters chanted "No to war!", "No mobilization" and "Our children are not fertilizer!" When up to several protesters gathered at a rally near the Puppet Theater, the police began arrests.

According to eyewitnesses, stun guns and peppercorns were used during the arrest, protesters, including women, were beaten with batons and shot into the air. According to OVD-Info, at least 101 people were arrested. The administrator of the telegram channel "Basement of Dagestan", which broadcast the events at the rally, was searched.

The events were covered by the journalists of the Chernovik newspaper, they reported on the obstruction of journalistic activities by the security forces. The Caucasian Knot correspondent was detained.

To calm the protesters, the Dagestan military commissar announced that people who do not have military experience, as well as conscripts, are not subject to conscription. He also called the rumors about 13,000 people subject to conscription in the republic false. Against the backdrop of protests, the head of Dagestan, Sergey Melikov, announced the mistakes made during mobilization activities, the next day he promised to personally check the mobilization points. The head of the Ministry of Youth of the Republic of Dagestan Kamil Saidov spoke about the paid shares by the West. The mayor of Makhachkala called the protest an attempt to disrupt the Day of the City of Makhachkala, which took place in parallel with the rally.

By the end of the day, the protest was dispersed by Rosgvardia troops. OVD-Info, following the results of the action reported "very tough" detentions.

Shortly after the dispersal of protests in Dagestan, the organizers decided to organize a partisan movement. According to the organizers of the partisan movement, "as early as 26 September, everyone will see their plan." At night, the organizers announced an ultimatum demanding the release of all detainees, otherwise they threatened to block federal highways in the republic and stop railway communication.

The following day, from 15:00 local time, people began to gather on the central square of Makhachkala. Soon, a mass brawl between protesters and police began on the central square. It is known about 110 detainees.

The square was cordoned off by the police and the National Guard from the very beginning. Eyewitnesses reported that security forces were beating protesters, while National Guard officers also threatened journalists and demanded that the video of the arrests be removed. The security forces also used tear gas against the protesters.

==== Nartkala ====
On 26 September, protests were reported in the Circassian town of Nartkala and photographs were published.

==== Khasavyurt ====
On the same day, in the city of Khasavyurt, about a hundred people came out to protest. There were skirmishes between the security forces and the protesters. The police carried out harsh arrests of protesters.

=== 30 September ===
Protest actions were announced in Makhachkala and other cities of Dagestan on 30 September. On the morning of September 30, there were reports that the FSB had detained some administrators and members of telegram channels that published calls for rallies. In the pro-government media, such telegram channels were called “created as part of the information and subversive action of the CIPSO GUR of the Ministry of Defense of Ukraine under the patronage of the US CIA”.

==== Makhachkala ====
According to Kavkaz.Realii, policemen set up barriers in the central square of the city, and an increased presence of law enforcement officers was observed around the square.

There was also a cluster of police near some mosques in the city. Most likely, law enforcement agencies were afraid that after Friday prayers, parishioners would go to demonstrations.

Senior students in six schools in Makhachkala, located in the center or close to it, were kept at school until 6–7 pm, extending the school day. At the same time, there were schools where classes were held as usual.

== Cases against detainees ==
On 27 September, the press secretary of the UN High Commissioner for Human Rights, Ravina Shamdasani, called on the Russian authorities to release the Russians detained for the protests, highlighting the situation in Dagestan. It was stated: "We emphasize that the arrest of people solely for exercising their right to peaceful assembly and freedom of expression constitutes arbitrary deprivation of liberty."

As of 28 September, 30 criminal cases have been initiated in Dagestan against those detained at the protests. Some of the cases are being handled by human rights activists from OVD-Info, lawyers report that all the defendants have bodily injuries. Lawyer Nadezhda Borodkina, who is in charge of 4 cases, said that the detainees were tortured in police departments.

== Reactions ==
On 23 September, the head of Chechnya, Ramzan Kadyrov, stated that mobilization in the region was cancelled.

On 25 September, the head of Dagestan, Sergey Melikov, stated that "a number of mistakes were made in the course of partial mobilization in the constituent entities of Russia." He asked for residents to report violations of citizens' legal rights and claimed that all the incidents would be investigated.

During the rallies on 25 September, President of Ukraine Volodymyr Zelenskyy issued an appeal to Dagestanis supporting the protest and urging them to resist the mobilization.

On 26 September, the head of Dagestan stated that "The protests in Makhachkala were controlled from abroad".

== See also ==
- 2022 anti-war protests in Russia
- 2022 Russian Far East protests
