= 2022 Russian Far East protests =

Protests against military mobilization

With the beginning of mobilization in Russia in September 2022 during the Russo-Ukrainian war, anti-war and anti-mobilization protests broke out in the Russian Far East, mostly performed by women. Former Mongolian President Tsakhiagiin Elbegdorj protested against usage of ethnic minorities such as the Buryats, Tuvans, and Kalmyks as cannon fodder, and invited them to Mongolia. The Tuvans belong to Turkic peoples but are also regarded in Mongolia as one of the Uriankhai peoples. (Note: "Uriyangqad, which is the plural form of Uriyangqan, itself originally a plural of Uriyangqai.": KRUEGER, John (1977). Tuvan Manual. p. 10. ISBN 9780700709267. - Which quotes from Serruys, Henry (1959). "The Mongols in China during the Hung-wu Period". Melanges chinois et bouddhiques. Vol. 11. Brussels: Imprimerie Sainte-Catherine. pp. 282–283.)

== Sakha ==
Women protested in Ordzhonikidze Square, in Yakutsk. Some elderly men were conscripted by mistake.

== Buryatia ==
Small groups protested in Ulan-Ude under handwritten signs "No war! No mobilization!" and "Our husbands, fathers and brothers don’t want to kill other husbands and fathers." The Free Buryatia Foundation collects appeals for help from families of mobilised men. According to Alexandra Garmazhapova, president of the foundation, some local people try to go to Mongolia.

Two fires were set in Salavat.

== Zabaykalsky Krai ==
Marina Salomatova, a member of the "Transbaikal Civil Solidarity", has been arrested in Chita, Zabaykalsky Krai.

== Tuva ==
Women protested against mobilization in Kyzyl, 20 of them were arrested.

== See also ==
- Anti-war protests in Russia (2022–present)
- 2022 North Caucasian protests
- Protests against the Russian invasion of Ukraine
