= 2022 Russian mobilization =

- Part of the Russo-Ukrainian War
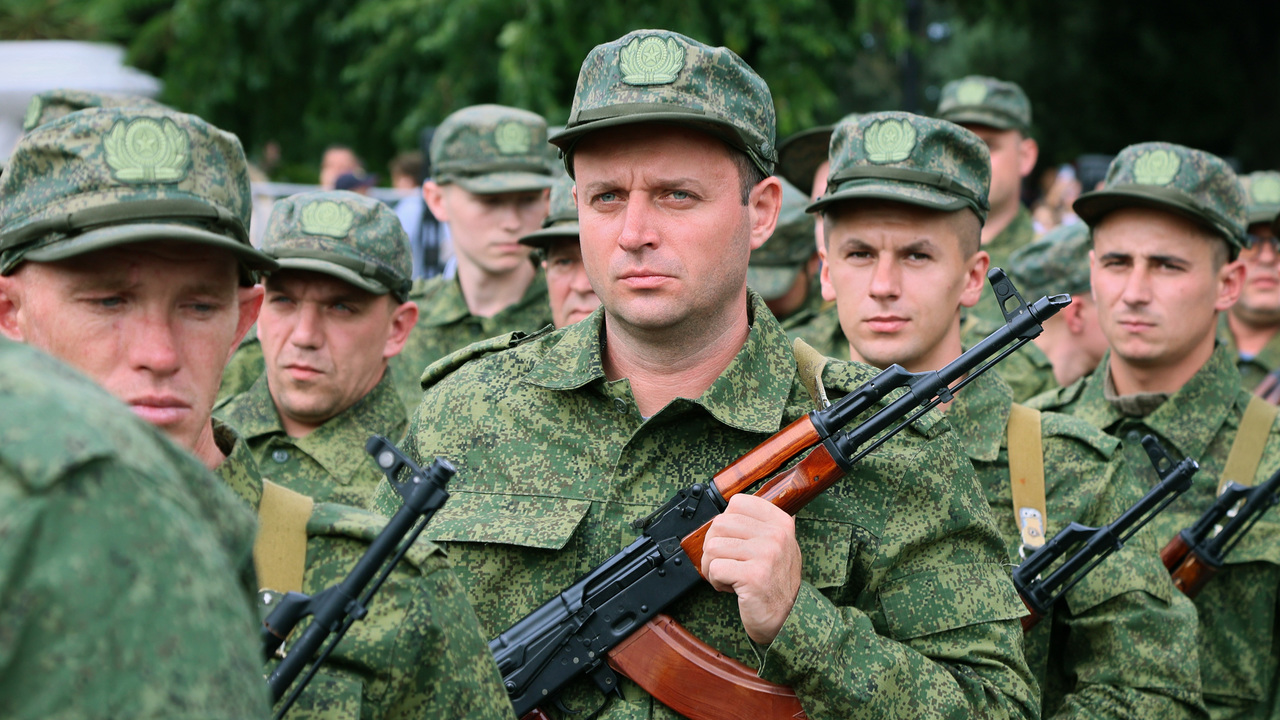
- Mobilized Russian soldiers in Sevastopol
- Native name: Частичная мобилизация в России
- Date: 21 September 2022 – present (Note: According to Russian law, a decree either ending recruitment for the war effort or repealing the one that authorised it is required to be signed by the president.) (4 years, 1 month, 2 weeks and 2 days)
- Location: Russia (incl. occupied Ukraine)
- Cause: Complications in the Russian invasion of Ukraine; Heavy casualties among Russian troops and lack of manpower compared to the fully mobilized Ukrainian military; Announcement of September referendums for Russian annexation of occupied Ukrainian regions in July; Beginning of major Ukrainian counter-offensives in Kherson and Kharkiv in August and September
- Organised by: Ministry of Defence of the Russian Federation
- Total affected: ≈300,000 people (according to the Ministry of Defense); Clause No. 7, which details the exact number of people to be mobilized, is classified under Russian law

On 21 September 2022, Russia declared that it was initiating a "partial mobilization" of military reservists to bolster the country's war effort against Ukraine. The announcement came after the Russian government's decision to conduct "annexation referendums" throughout occupied Ukraine—on behalf of the entirety of four Ukrainian regions that it only controlled in part: Donetsk, Luhansk, Kherson, and Zaporizhzhia. The mobilization is widely believed to have been introduced to address the Russian military's heavy casualties and lack of manpower, particularly in the face of major Ukrainian counter-offensives in Kherson and Kharkiv.

Russian Minister of Defence Sergei Shoigu announced that Russia had a "huge mobilization reserve" and planned to mobilize 300,000 recruits. The precise details of the mobilization plans are currently unclear, however, as the exact number of people to be mobilized is classified. In addition to Russia proper, tens of thousands of people were mobilized in Donetsk and Luhansk to fight for the Russian separatist militias that had been active in those regions since 2014.

On 28 October, Russian president Vladimir Putin announced that mobilization had been completed. However, it has been speculated that this announcement only indicated an end to formal mobilization and that covert mobilization would still occur until the president's signing of a relevant decree. Putin's spokesman Dmitry Peskov has refuted this claim, but in late December 2022, numerous military analysts and media outlets maintained that mobilization efforts were persisting across Russia. On 18 May 2023, the Supreme Court of Russia issued Ruling No. 11. "On the practice of consideration by the courts of criminal cases for crimes against military service": the second paragraph states that the period of mobilization (partial or general) begins from the date and time of the start of mobilization, as established by the relevant presidential decree, and ends with the date and time of cancellation (termination) of mobilization. Thus, the September 2022 mobilization for the Russian invasion of Ukraine is still in force as of September 2025.

== Background ==
According to The Moscow Times, Russian authorities had repeatedly rejected the possibility of mobilization at least 15 times prior to the announcement of partial mobilization. For example, on 8 March, Vladimir Putin publicly promised that no reservists would be called upon to fight in Ukraine.

Russia had previously avoided declaring mobilization in Ukraine until this point. Previously, mobilizations were conducted in the Russian Empire during the Russo-Japanese War in 1904 and at the beginning of World War I in 1914. The Soviet Union mobilized its population and industry following the 1941 Nazi German invasion during World War II.

=== Donetsk and Luhansk People's Republics ===
Crimea, which Russia annexed in 2014, is shown in pink. Pink in the Donbas area represents areas held by the DPR/LPR separatists in September 2014 (cities in red)

On 19 February 2022, general mobilization began in the Donetsk and Luhansk People's Republics (DNR and LNR), which at that time were not recognized by any sovereign state, including Russia. Tens of thousands of local residents were forcibly mobilized for the war (according to one estimate, up to 140,000 people by mid-June 2022).

The mobilization was accompanied by mass raids on men of military age. In the enterprises of the region, up to 80% of employees were called up, which led to the shutdown of mines and public transport, as well as the paralysis of cities and public services. To avoid mobilization, residents hid or tried to illegally leave the republics.

The mobilization revealed numerous problems of the armed forces of the DNR and LNR. Recruits without training and combat experience found themselves on the front lines without adequate supplies: the units lacked uniforms, weapons, food, and medicines. Human rights activists reported a huge death toll among mobilized recruits in clashes with the better-trained Ukrainian military—up to 30,000 as of August 2022.

=== Russia ===
Distribution of mobilization summons for reservists began in April. The summons handed out did not indicate the purpose of the call-up. Presumably, they were sent out to invite men to military registration and enlistment offices, where they would draft contracts to take part in the mobilization of reserves.

On 28 May, the Russian parliament amended their military call-up legislation, thereby removing the age limit for those wishing to enlist.

After Ukrainian counteroffensives in September 2022, Putin came under increasing pressure from Russian ultra-nationalists and pro-war activists such as Igor Girkin and Alexander Kots, who called for full mobilization and all-out war against Ukraine. Girkin said full mobilization in Russia was the "last chance" for victory.

==== Russian losses ====
In September, Russian Defense Minister Shoigu announced that the Russian military had suffered 5,937 soldiers killed during the war and that 90% of the wounded had returned to battle. Shoigu's statement was widely regarded to be misleading; as of 16 September, Russian forces had suffered at least 6,476 deaths confirmed by name, according to the BBC. Even this number was confirmed to be low; the list of losses provided by the BBC could be at least 40–60% less than the number of actual military dead buried in Russia, not to mention soldiers whose bodies were left in Ukraine or were deliberately marked as "missing in action."

The BBC collected data on the deaths of more than a thousand elite military professionals, including more than 70 military pilots, more than 370 marines, hundreds of paratroopers, and more than 200 GRU special forces soldiers, of whom one in four were officers. On 21 September, the General Staff of Ukraine gave a figure of 55,100 losses of Russian forces.

On 12 October, citing sources close to the Kremlin, the independent Russian media project iStories reported that more than 90,000 Russian soldiers had been killed, seriously wounded, or gone missing in Ukraine.

== Prelude ==
=== Volunteer recruitment campaign ===
Even before the Kharkiv counteroffensive, the personnel situation in Russia was already considered critical, with personnel from other war zones, such as Syria and South Ossetia, being redeployed to Ukraine to make up for the lack of manpower.

Around June and July 2022, local authorities of the federal subjects of Russia were tasked with doing a recruitment campaign to form new military formations in what was called a "covert mobilization." Each federal subject was to form and send a "volunteer battalion." Volunteers were offered short-term contracts with a pay of 40,000 to 50,000 rubles that will increase to 130,000 rubles once they enter in Ukraine. By August, the newly mobilized volunteer units were grouped in the 3rd Army Corps.

=== Legislative changes ===
On 20 September, the day before the mobilization, the State Duma of Russia unanimously adopted amendments to include the concepts of mobilization, martial law, and wartime in the Criminal Code and introduced several articles related to military operations. Now, during the period of mobilization, voluntary surrender was now punishable by a 10-year prison sentence; looting up to 15 years, and unauthorized abandonment of a military unit up to 10 years. Criminal liability was also introduced for reserve recruits who deserted or failed to show up for training. The law also introduced punishment for failure to comply with an order, as well as for refusing to participate in hostilities and operations.

Political scientist Ekaterina Schulmann noted that on the official portal of the State Duma, the bill was marked as adopted by both houses of parliament, signed by the president and published, although only the State Duma had voted for it at that moment.

=== Recruitment of prisoners ===
Beginning in July 2022, Wagner PMC representatives began visiting Russian penal colonies. According to media sources, Wagner first began a recruiting tour from the colonies for former security forces and then switched to high-security institutions. He invited the prisoners to take part in hostilities as part of his PMC in exchange for a pardon, removal of their criminal record, a Russian passport, and cash payments (100 thousand rubles per month, 5 million in case of death). In September, a video appeared to confirm the recruitment of prisoners personally by Prigozhin, filmed in strict regime colony No. 6 in Mari El.

The Russia Behind Bars foundation has collected reports about the recruitment of prisoners—according to this data, 9,728 people have been recruited as of 14 September 2022.

== Putin's speech ==
After a delay in broadcasting Vladimir Putin announces a partial mobilization in his address on the morning of 21 September. (Subtitled in English)

On 21 September, Vladimir Putin announced the mobilization in Russia in a pre-recorded speech that aired at 9:00 Moscow time. The speech followed the State Duma's amendments to the Criminal Code. In his televised address, he said that Russia was at war with the "collective West," implicitly threatening the use of nuclear weapons. He said that "in order to protect our motherland, its sovereignty and territorial integrity, and to ensure the safety of our people and people in the liberated territories," he decided to declare a "partial mobilization" of the Russian reserve force. In his speech, Putin stated that the mobilization was suggested to him by the Ministry of Defense and General Staff of the Armed Forces. Putin said that only citizens with prior military experience would be eligible for mobilization and would receive the same conditions as contract soldiers.

Putin accused the United States and European Union of "nuclear blackmail" against the Russian Federation, and stated that "The Russian Federation retains the right to use nuclear weapons in response." Putin reaffirmed his support for the annexation referendums in occupied Ukrainian territories, pointing to the referendums as a justification for Russia to mobilize.

In his address to the Russian audience, Putin demonized the "Nazi" West and claimed that the Ukrainian government was sending soldiers to the front lines as "cannon fodder." Putin also claimed that the West was trying to divide Russia. Despite the successful Ukrainian counteroffensive in the Kharkiv and Kherson regions, Putin maintained in his address that Russia's goals in Ukraine had not changed.

== Decree ==
Shortly after Putin's speech, an official decree was published enacting the announced mobilization:

1. Declare partial mobilization in the Russian Federation from 21 September 2022.
2. Carry out the call-up of citizens of the Russian Federation for military service for mobilization in the Armed Forces of the Russian Federation. Citizens of the Russian Federation called up for military service by mobilization have the status of military personnel serving in the Armed Forces of the Russian Federation under a contract.
3. Establish that the level of pay for citizens of the Russian Federation called up for military service for mobilization into the Armed Forces of the Russian Federation corresponds to the level of pay for military personnel serving in the Armed Forces of the Russian Federation under a contract.
4. Contracts for military service concluded by military personnel continue to be valid until the end of the period of partial mobilization, with the exception of cases of dismissal of military personnel from military service on the grounds established by this decree.
5. Establish during the period of partial mobilization the following grounds for the dismissal from military service of military personnel undergoing military service under a contract, as well as citizens of the Russian Federation called up for military service for mobilization in the Armed Forces of the Russian Federation:
  1. by age – upon reaching the age limit for military service;
  2. for health reasons – in connection with their recognition by the military medical commission as unfit for military service, with the exception of military personnel who have expressed a desire to continue military service in military positions that can be replaced by the specified military personnel;
  3. in connection with the entry into force of a court verdict on the imposition of a sentence of imprisonment.
6. To the Government of the Russian Federation:
  1. to finance activities for partial mobilization;
  2. take the necessary measures to meet the needs of the Armed Forces of the Russian Federation, other troops, military formations, and bodies during the period of partial mobilization.
7. For official use only (classified)
8. The highest officials of the constituent entities of the Russian Federation shall ensure the conscription of citizens for military service for mobilization in the Armed Forces of the Russian Federation in the number and within the time limits determined by the Ministry of Defense of the Russian Federation for each constituent entity of the Russian Federation.
9. Grant citizens of the Russian Federation working in organizations of the military-industrial complex the right to deferment from conscription for military service for mobilization (for the period of work in these organizations). The categories of citizens of the Russian Federation who are granted the right to deferment and the procedure for granting it are determined by the Government of the Russian Federation.
10. This decree shall enter into force on the day of its official publication.

=== Official publication and entry into force ===
The first page of the Decree of the President of Russia of 21 September 2022 No. 647 "On the announcement of partial mobilization in the Russian Federation"

The Presidential Decree of 21 September 2022 No. 647 "On the announcement of partial mobilization in the Russian Federation" was published on the Official Internet Portal of Legal Information pravo.gov.ru on 21 September 2022. Also, the decree was published on 22 September 2022 on the front page of issue 223(8861) of the Rossiyskaya Gazeta.

According to point 10 of the decree, this decree entered into force from the day of official publication (i.e., on 21 September 2022, when the decree was published on the Official Internet Portal of Legal Information).

=== Point 7 ===
Point number 7 of the decree is classified. In the public version of the decree posted on Russian government websites, point 7 was not available and was marked as "for official use". Peskov told press that the classified clause referred to the number of reservists who could be called up for military service.

The banned opposition newspaper Novaya Gazeta, operating in exile, reported on 22 September 2022 that the classified point 7 gives the Defense Department permission to mobilize up to one million men. Putin's spokesperson Dmitry Peskov denied this, calling the reports "a lie." On 23 September 2022, a source close to one of Russia's federal ministries told Meduza that 1.2 million people were going to be conscripted. Peskov also denied this.

== Organization ==
=== Text of decree ===
The decree does not say that only reserve servicemen are subject to conscription. It lists the grounds for dismissal from military service: on the basis of age, state of health, court sentence, or imprisonment. Deferment from conscription is granted to employees of the military-industrial complex.

The law on mobilization also limits citizens registered with the military from leaving the country:

Citizens who are registered with the military, from the moment of the announcement of mobilization, are prohibited from leaving their place of residence without the permission of military commissariats, federal executive bodies that have a reserve.

— Paragraph 2 of article 21 of the Federal Law of 26 February 1997 No. 31-FZ "About mobilization preparation and mobilization in the Russian Federation"

The State Duma deputies voted for the introduction of the concepts of "wartime" and "martial law" the day before the announcement of mobilization. Senators and deputies of the State Duma are not subject to mobilization.

=== Citizens to be mobilized ===
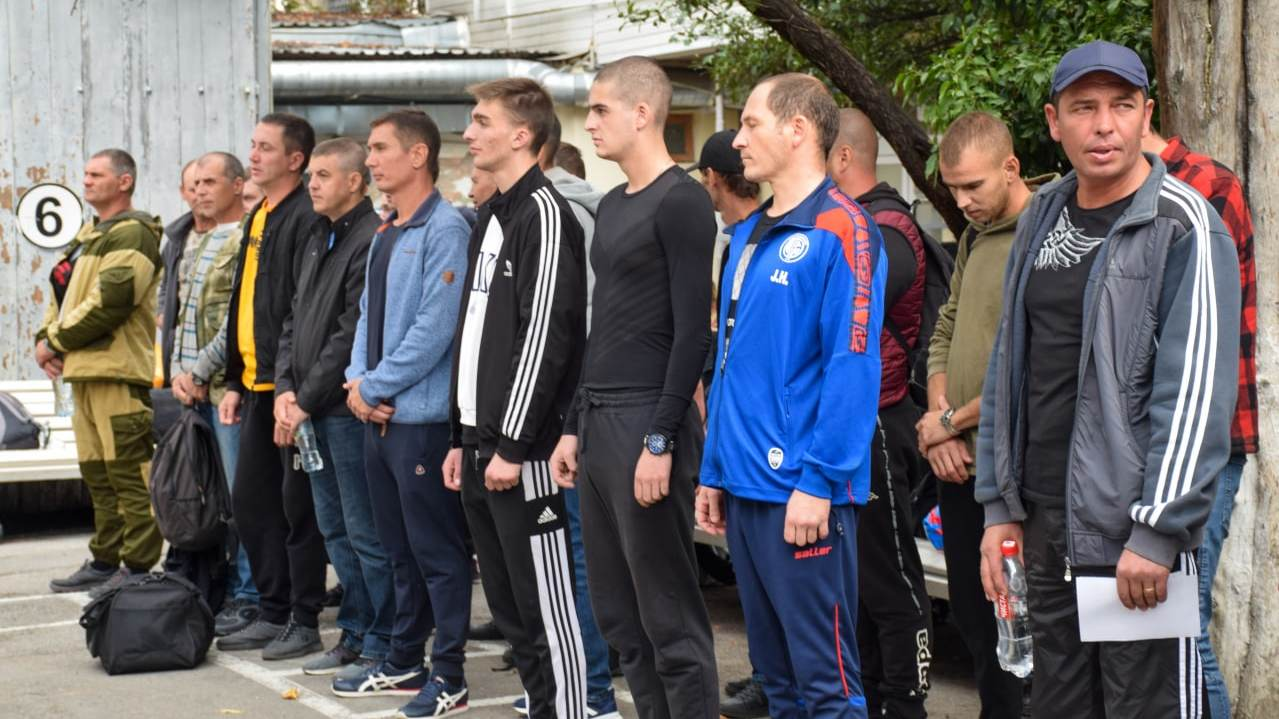
Men at a recruiting station in Yalta, Russian-occupied Crimea

According to Putin's televised address, "only citizens who are currently in the reserve and, above all, those who served in the armed forces, have certain military specialties and relevant experience" would be subject to conscription. According to Shoigu, 300,000 reservists were planned to be mobilized, called from a pool of 25 million "potential fighters." Conscripts would be sent for training or retraining, after which they would be sent to Ukraine. Reservists may be banned from leaving Russia after receiving a summons. The Institute for the Study of War estimated in March that Russia's reserve comprised over two million former conscripts or contract soldiers.

Political scientist Ekaterina Schulmann noted that according to the text of Putin's decree on mobilization, "anyone can be called up, except for workers in the military-industrial complex." Lawyer and head of the human rights group Agora, Pavel Chikov, expressed doubts about the decree, stating that the Russian Ministry of Defense, in fact, would decide who, from where, and what quantity of soldiers to send to war."

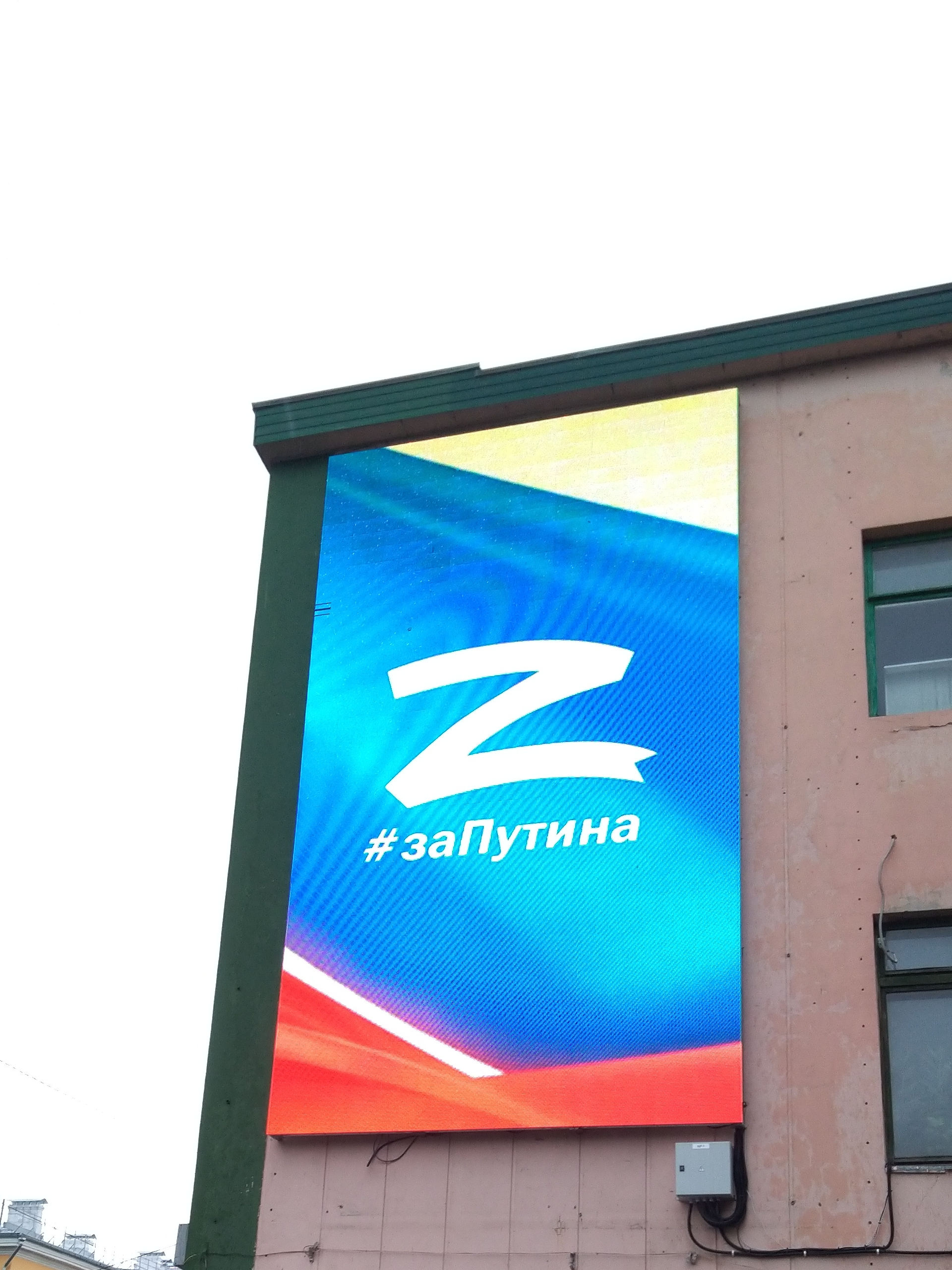
Z symbol on a billboard reads Russian: За Путина, lit. 'For Putin'

On 22 September Ramzan Kadyrov, the head of Chechnya, stated that mobilization would not be carried out in the Chechen Republic. He explained this by saying the republic had already overfulfilled their duties for force generation.

== Implementation ==
The military commissars of some Russian regions forbade persons in the reserve to travel outside their districts of residence, and stated that those who had received a summons or received a mobilization order were obliged to appear at registration offices. Employers of persons who have received summons or have mobilization orders were also ordered to make settlements with such persons and ensure their appearance at said offices.

Britain's Ministry of Defence stated that many new recruits were being deployed to the front lines in Ukraine without any training or proper equipment. One conscripted soldier wrote in a social media post: "We were officially told there would be no training before going to the front. The regiment commander confirmed this information that on the (Sep.) 29th we will go to Kherson." A Russian officer told a group of mobilized men in a video posted on social media: "You're all soldiers now. Three days here. A flight. And then two weeks of military training." According to retired U.S. General Ben Hodges, "It is criminal to send untrained soldiers into combat... it's murder. I doubt these men will survive very long."

Mikhail Degtyarev, the governor of Khabarovsk Krai, said that "about half of [the mobilized men] we returned home, as they did not meet the selection criteria for entering the military service."

In a video published by the independent news website The Insider, recently mobilized Russian soldiers complained of "inhumane" conditions, weapons shortages, and mistreatment by officers. Ukraine's Ministry of Defense compared Russian soldiers' living conditions to the Netflix TV show Squid Game. Zabaykalsky Krai Duma deputy Andrey Gurulev said that 1.5 million sets of uniforms had "disappeared" from the MoD. The Governor of the Omsk Region Alexander Burkov said that his region had a budget deficit of 13 billion rubles and had no money for mobilized men.

It was reported that Russian authorities were targeting poor, homeless, and people from poorer regions of Russia for conscription. Russian authorities drafted detained protestors with no previous military experience, including a 17-year-old boy who was arrested at an anti-war demonstration in Moscow.

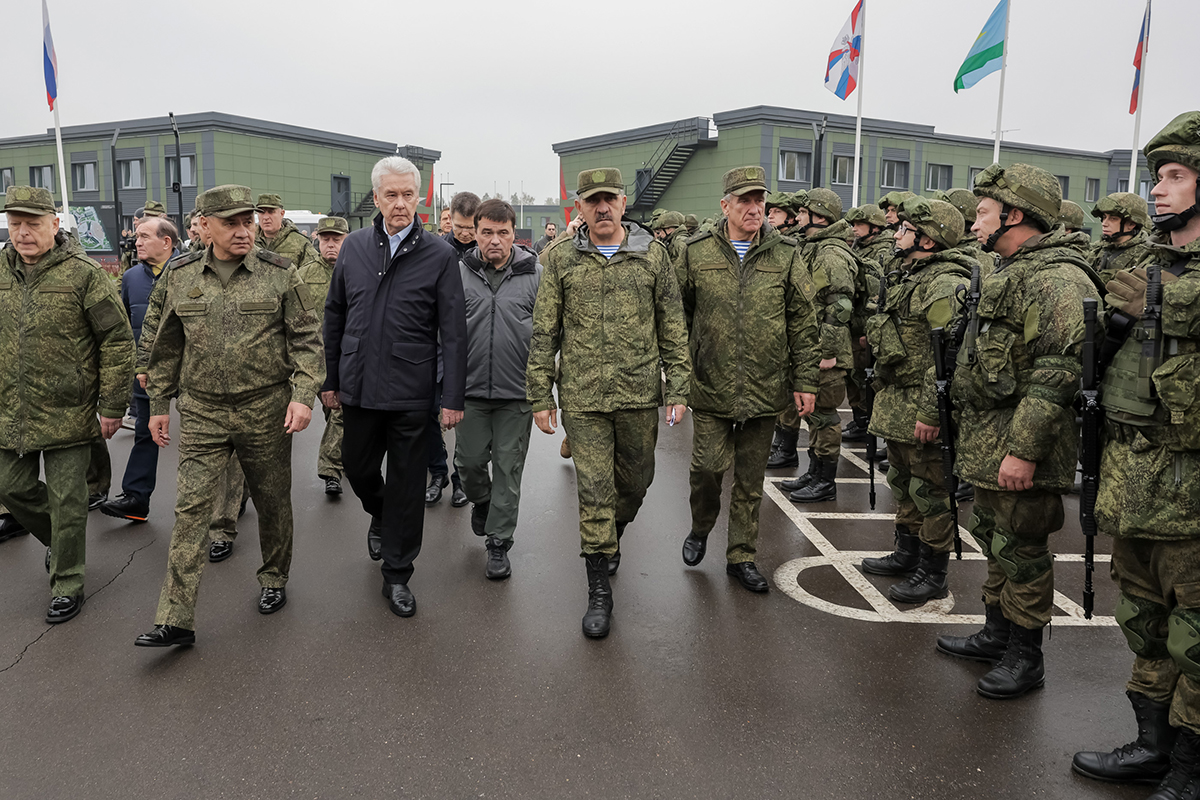
Defence Minister Sergei Shoigu, Deputy Defense Minister Yunus-bek Yevkurov and Moscow Mayor Sergey Sobyanin inspected the facilities where the mobilized Russian recruits are being trained on 1 October 2022

Some of the mobilized Russian men were killed less than two weeks after being drafted, including one man who was killed near the Ukrainian city of Lysychansk on 7 October, indicating that Russian men were being sent to the front without any basic military training, which ran contrary to Putin's promise that all mobilized civilians would receive proper training before being sent into combat. Some of the draftees bought uniforms and boots themselves before being sent into combat, without even minimal training.

Female doctors were mobilized for the war in Ukraine. According to Renata Zhiltsova, who received a summons from a military enlistment office in the Siberian city of Omsk, "I wasn't the only woman doctor whom they wanted to send to war. There are female gynecologists and dentists among my friends who were mobilized for the war. Some of them even had babies."

=== Dates ===
==== 2022 ====
The military commissar of the Kaliningrad Oblast, Colonel Yuriy Boychenko, publicly stated that mobilization summons will be distributed before the relevant presidential decree, indicating the ambiguity about the end of the mobilization period.

In Omsk, the families of conscripts were told that there would be three waves of mobilization—from 26 September to 10 October, from 11 to 25 October, and from 26 October to 10 November. This was supported by an audio recording from a meeting from the military registration and enlistment office. Information about three waves of conscription was also confirmed from Krasnoyarsk Krai. A Russian military expert speculated that a second wave might take place at the end of 2022. However, on 11 October 2022, Yury Shvyktin, deputy head of the State Duma's defense committee, stated that mobilization would not be divided into phases, and that statements about first and second phases were "groundless." On 12 October, Kremlin spokesman Dmitry Peskov also denied the existence of a second wave.

On 28 October, the Russian Minister of Defense Sergei Shoigu reported to Russian President Vladimir Putin that no new events were planned within the framework of partial mobilization. Military registration and enlistment offices would continue to work with volunteers and contract soldiers. It has been speculated that officially, mobilization will only end after Putin signs the relevant decree; Putin himself has questioned this point of view. On 1 November 2022, Kremlin spokesman Dmitry Peskov stated that a decree was not needed to end mobilization.

On 5 November, Putin signed a decree that allows people convicted of serious crimes to be mobilized into the Russian army. The exemption does not include people convicted of sex crimes involving minors and crimes against the state such as treason, spying, or terrorism. This could allow "hundreds of thousands" of people to be mobilized. Putin also claimed that 18,000 more people have been mobilized over the goal of 300,000.

==== 2023 ====
On 14 April 2023, Putin signed into law a bill that would allow authorities to issue electronic summons to draftees. The law blocks anyone eligible for military service who has received a digital summons from leaving the country. Russian lawyer Valeria Vetoshkina called it a "hidden mobilization." According to Russian economist Konstantin Sonin, "Now, any person, regardless of whether he took a summons or not, [or] has an account with Gosuslugi or not, can be arrested and convicted for not going to war." Russian lawyer and human rights activist Ivan Pavlov said that the "only option is to leave the country as soon as possible, but there is very little time for that."

==== 2025–2026 ====
Following the initial mobilization phase, the Russian government increasingly relied on alternative, coercive tactics to sustain its troop levels in Ukraine while avoiding a second nationwide mobilization campaign. By 2025 and 2026, regional authorities and security forces intensified localized enforcement operations to meet recruitment targets, conducting unannounced identity checks and raids in commercial and recreational venues. In early 2025, such operations were reported at fitness centers and martial arts clubs in Moscow and Saint Petersburg, where police detained patrons to verify their military registration status and forcibly transported those without valid paperwork directly to military commissariats.

Security forces systematically targeted migrant workers and newly naturalized Russian citizens, particularly those from Central Asian nations, coercing at least 20,000 individuals into military service. During these raids on dormitories and workplaces, detained individuals were pressured into military service under threats of deportation, revocation of citizenship, or fabricated criminal charges.

Independent watchdogs and local media reports from regions such as Penza Oblast described forced mobilisation operations in which military commissariats conducted street detentions and pressured individuals, including people with debts or under administrative supervision, to sign military contracts. Russian legislation was also amended to allow conscription procedures to be conducted throughout the year beginning in 2026, replacing the previous system of seasonal conscription campaigns.

== Reactions ==
=== In Russia ===
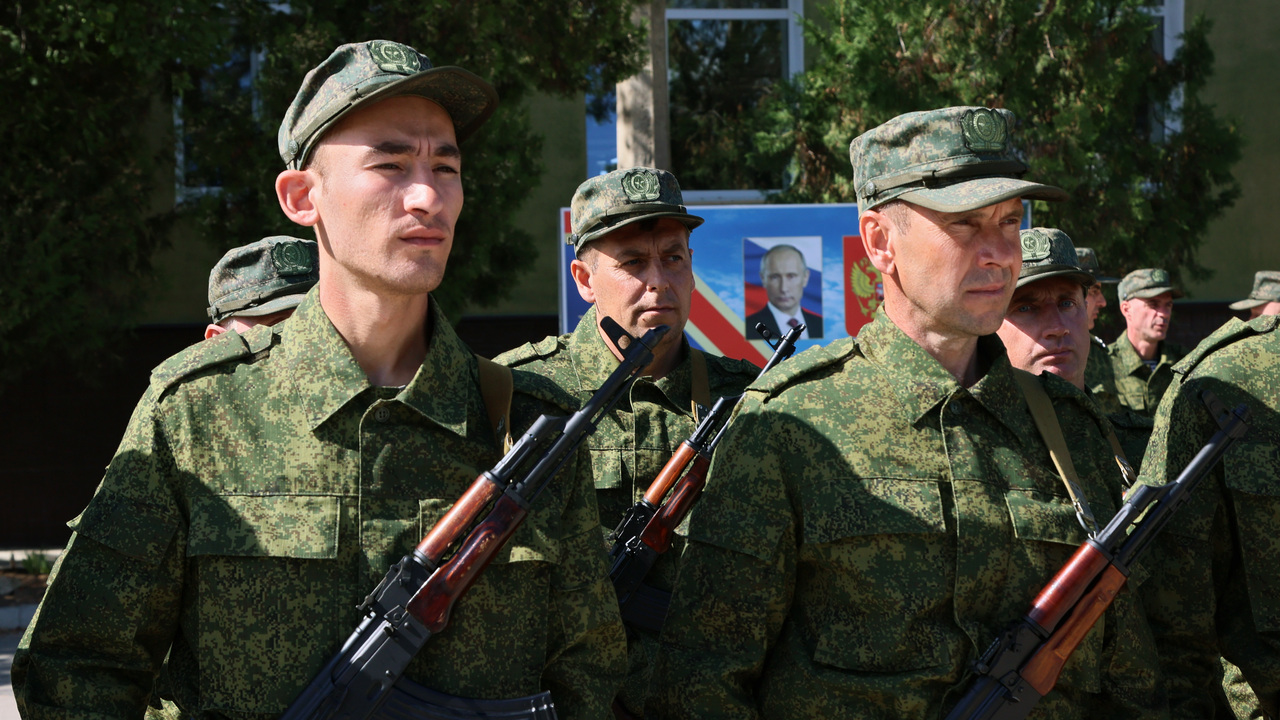
Mobilized Russian men armed with AKM rifles

On 22 September, Deputy Chairman of the Russian Security Council Dmitry Medvedev said that newly mobilized recruits could be used to protect the newly annexed territories in Russian-occupied Ukraine.

Roskomnadzor demanded the Russian media write about mobilization, using information "exclusively" from Russian government sources, and threatened disobeying outlets with fines of up to 5 million rubles and blocking.

Imprisoned Russian opposition politician Alexei Navalny said, "I don’t understand one thing. The army has a million people; Rosgvardia has 350,000 people; the Interior Ministry has another million and a half or two million people; and the Federal Penitentiary Service is full of people. Why are they drafting civilians?"

In the Levada Center poll, conducted from 22–28 September, 47% of surveyed Russians said they had felt "anxiety, fear, and horror" following Vladimir Putin's announcement on 21 September. Another 23% said they had felt "shock," while 13% felt "anger and indignation," and 23% said they felt "pride for Russia."

Bashkir activist Fail Alsynov called the mobilization a genocide of the Bashkir people. There have been allegations that Russia is sending a disproportionate number of men from ethnic minorities to fight in Ukraine.

A Russian field survey of 21–29 October 2023 showed that 58% of those polled opposed the second mobilization. In May 2024, Kremlin sources told Reuters that Putin was ready to end the war in Ukraine with a negotiated ceasefire that would recognize Russia's war gains and freeze the war on current front lines, as Putin wanted to avoid unpopular steps such as further nationwide mobilization.

According to the Russian independent website Astra, hundreds of Russian men who refused to fight in Ukraine were transported from a military facility near St. Petersburg to a war zone in the Kursk Oblast.

In April 2025, a Russian military court sentenced a mobilized man from Sakhalin to 15 years in prison. He was mobilized in 2022 and deserted in June 2023, voluntarily surrendering to Ukrainian troops, but was later sent back to Russia in a prisoner exchange.

==== Markets ====
Russian markets reacted to the introduction of mobilization with a moderate collapse. By 10:43 Moscow time, the MOEX Index had fallen by more than 4%, and the RTS Index by 5%. After the opening of the exchange, the US dollar against the ruble rose to 62.61 rubles in less than two hours (+2.01 rubles by the close of trading on 20 September).

==== Russian officials and their families ====
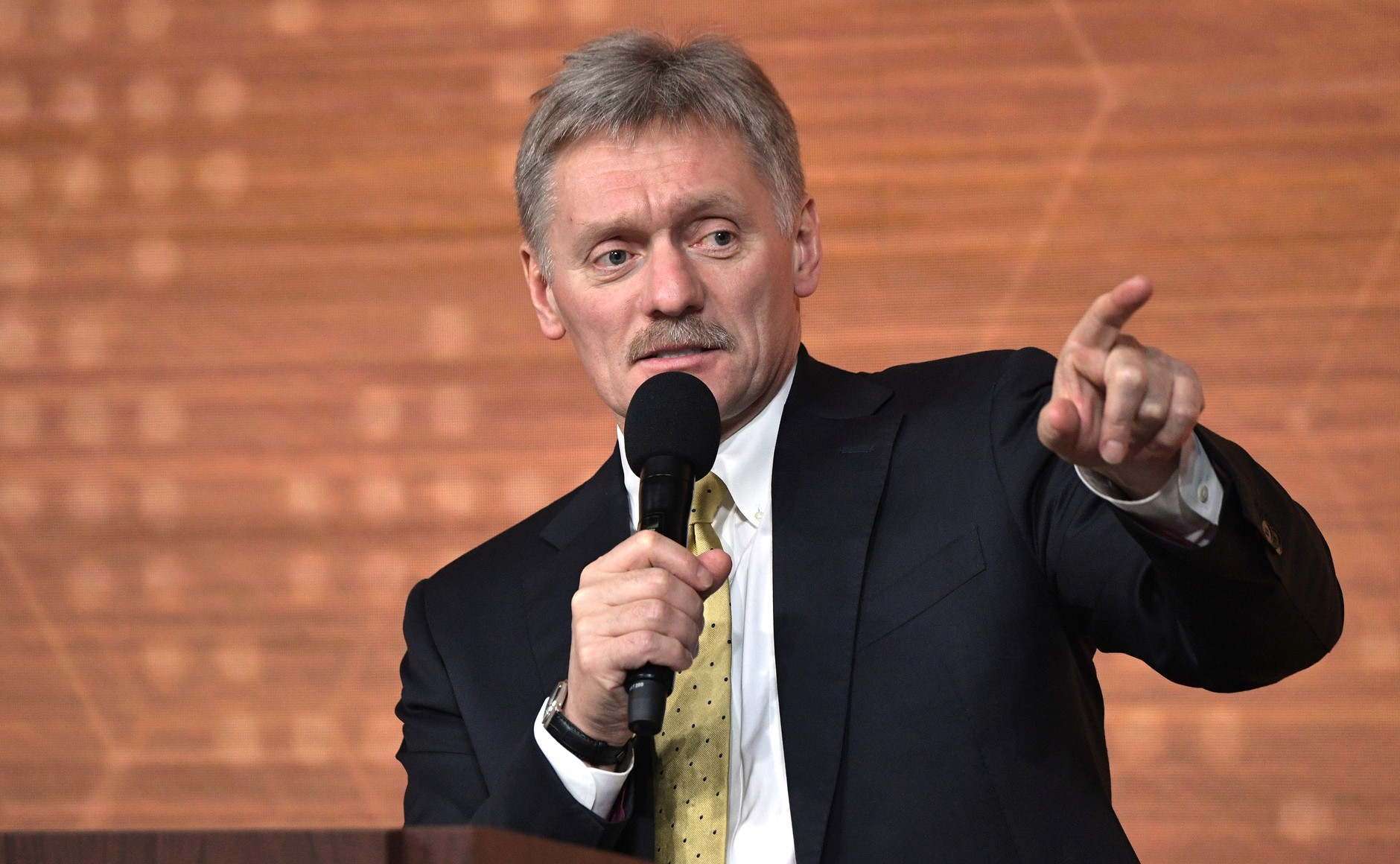
The son of high-ranking Kremlin official Dmitry Peskov stated he had no intention of obeying a mobilization order to fight in Ukraine, citing his family status.

Russians critical of the mobilizations have used social media and other electronic means to enquire, en masse, of Russia's top officials and deputies, who supported the war and mobilization, whether they themselves or their sons would go to the front. There have been a few officials who intended to do so, but most either refused to answer or gave excuses, such as Alexey Mishustin (premier Mikhail Mishustin's son), ignored the citizens' questions (Moscow city council deputy Andrey Zyuganov, the grandson of Gennady Zyuganov) or blocked the person asking (Dmitry Rogozin).

Nikolay Peskov, the son of Putin's spokesman Dmitry Peskov, told pranksters, who pretended to be recruitment officers, that he had no intention of going to war and would resolve the issue "on a different level." It was seen as an example of nepotism in Russia.

State Duma deputy Mikhail Matveyev, who opposed the full-scale invasion, suggested that Russian governors and lawmakers who support the war and mobilization should enlist and fight in Ukraine. While Khabarovsk Krai Governor Mikhail Degtyarev expressed a desire to volunteer, he claimed his official duties prevented him from doing so. In response, local residents launched a petition to remove Degtyarev from office and send him to the front, which garnered tens of thousands of signatures. Russian State Duma chairman Vyacheslav Volodin said that the State Duma would support deputies who want to enlist in the army and go to war in Ukraine. Putin loyalist Dmitry Vyatkin, the author of several restrictive bills, argued in a speech that lawmakers should not resign to fight at the front, claiming they have a duty to remain in office to address domestic issues and serve Russian citizens.

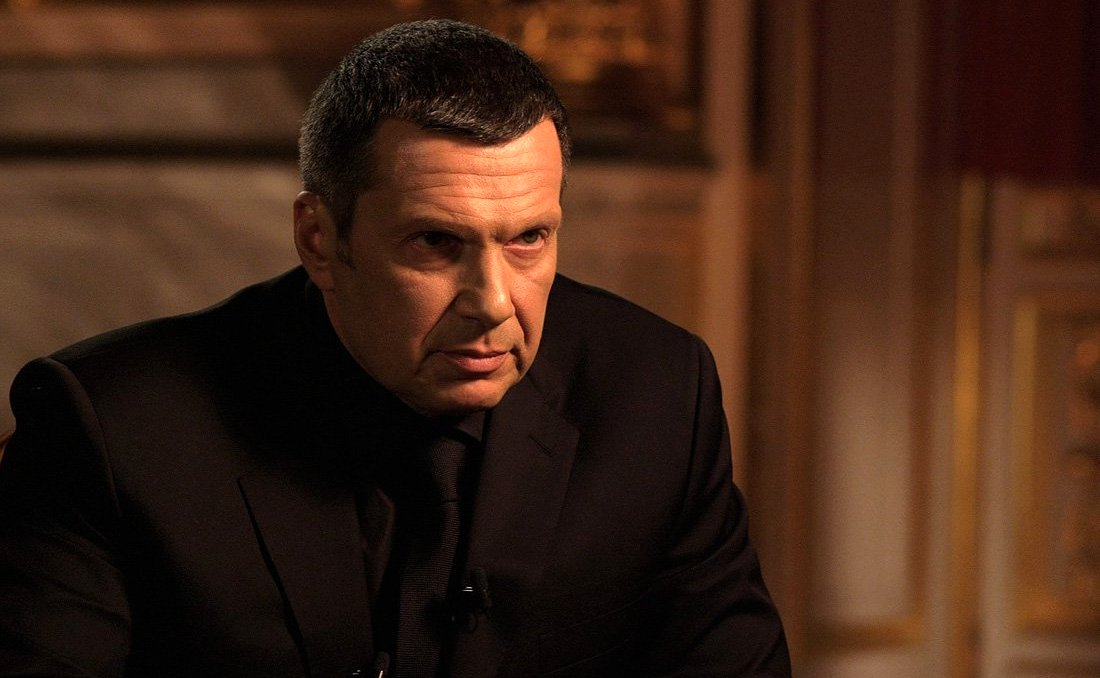
Vladimir Solovyov, who previously condemned young people for dodging the draft, defended his 21-year-old son against critics questioning his failure to volunteer.

Yevgeny Prigozhin called members of the Russian parliament "useless" and said that the "deputies should go to the front," adding that "those people who have been talking from tribunes for years need to start doing something."

Margarita Simonyan, the head of state broadcaster RT, complained about "millions of security officers and guards" who are being used in Russia, but are not sent to the front. Speaking of the chaotic mobilization and reports of old, disabled, or otherwise unfit men, getting called up into the army, Vladimir Solovyov, the host of the Russian State TV show Evening with Vladimir Solovyov, suggested that recruitment officers who call up the wrong people should either be shot or sent to the front to fight themselves.

Russian opposition politician Emilia Slabunova, a member of the Legislative Assembly of the Republic of Karelia, wrote a letter to President Vladimir Putin urging him to officially declare the end of mobilization. She wrote that the absence of such a decree "affects the psychological state of society."

In February 2023, Putin's leading propagandist Vladimir Solovyov defended his 21-year-old son Daniil against critics who asked why his son had not enlisted in the Russian army. Vladimir Solovyov had previously encouraged every able-bodied Russian man to volunteer for service and go fight in the war in Ukraine, and he had condemned young people who tried to avoid mobilization.

==== Within the Russian military ====
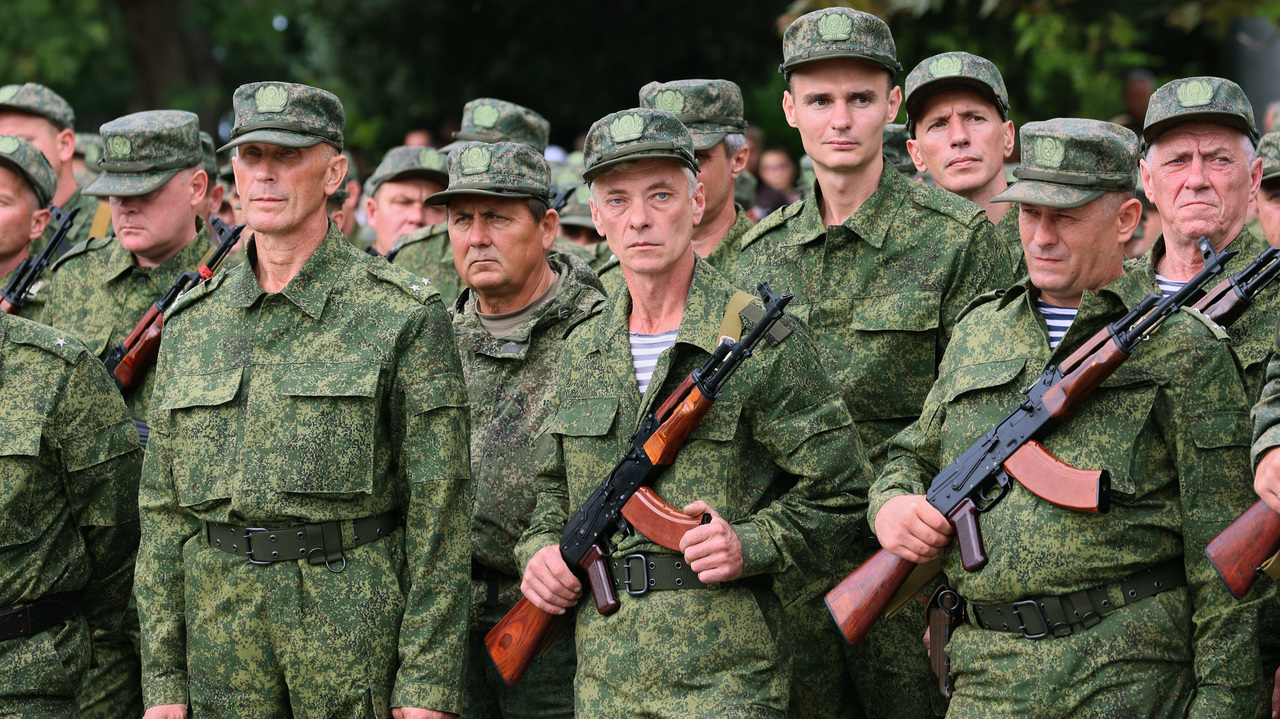
Residents of Russian-occupied Crimea mobilized for military service in Ukraine

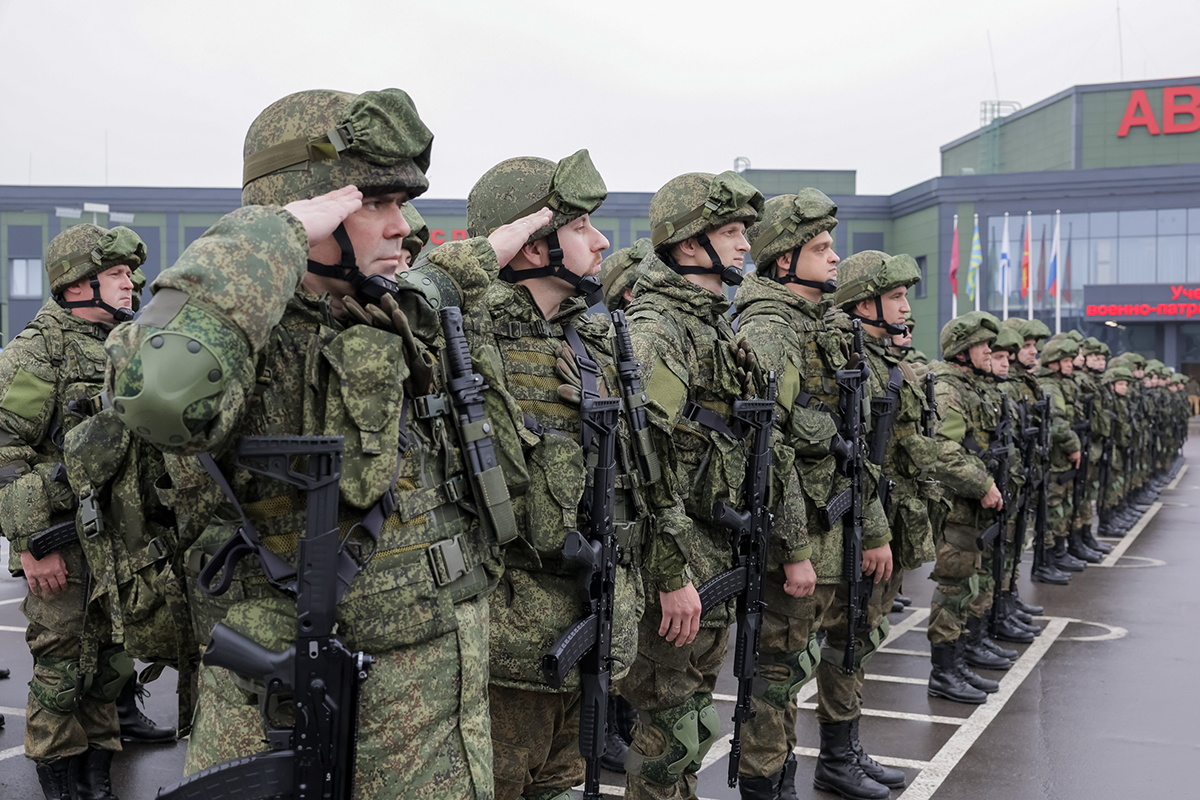
Mobilized Russian troops at a training facility on 1 October 2022

On 4 October 2022, a video appeared of a man in front of a group of soldiers from Omsk Oblast voicing concern to the military leadership, primarily about payment to support their families while they were away at war.

On 16 November 2022, Vadim Boyko, a Colonel, and director of Vladivostok's Makarov Pacific Higher Naval School who was responsible for mobilization efforts, committed suicide by shooting himself in the chest five times in his office. Afterwards, his widow claimed he was depressed and threatened with charges for failing to meet his recruitment quotas.

==== Help for army conscripts ====
Numerous human rights and public organizations expressed their readiness to help mobilized Russians. Among them are Agora, Committee of Soldiers' Mothers, Conscript's School, Movement of Conscious Objectors from Military Service, Call to Conscience, and Citizen and Army.

==== Exodus of Russians ====
Russian citizens reportedly purchased plane tickets to other countries following the mobilization. Before the televised address of Russian President Vladimir Putin, all air tickets to Istanbul on 21 September, as well as almost all tickets to Yerevan, were sold. Russia's Federal Security Service stated that 261,000 Russians had already left Russia as of 26 September. On 6 October, the Kremlin denied reports that 700,000 Russians have fled the country since Putin announced the mobilization order.

After the announcement of mobilization, many kilometers of traffic jams formed at Russia's borders with Kazakhstan, Georgia, Belarus, Finland, and Mongolia: along the Georgian border, vehicles were lined up for at least 10 kilometres (6.2 mi) and near Kazakhstan, cars were abandoned as motorists fled. Finland, Poland, and the Baltic Countries announced they would not offer refuge to Russians fleeing mobilization. Chair of the Senate of Kazakhstan Mäulen Äşimbaev announced that Kazakhstan would not issue permanent residence permits to Russian citizens evading mobilization without permission from the Russian government. More than 200,000 Russian men fled to Kazakhstan. In the first week after the announcement, Georgia took in the most refugees. Two men fled Russia by boat, landing in the small town of Gambell, Alaska, on 4 October, and sought for asylum.

On 27 September 2022, White House press secretary Karine Jean-Pierre encouraged Russian men trying to escape being called up to fight in Ukraine to apply for asylum in the United States. In early 2023, the Biden administration resumed deportations of Russians who had fled Russia due to mobilization and political persecution. Texas-based attorney Jennifer Scarborough said that "fleeing the draft can actually be a valid claim for asylum. If we’re against this war [in Ukraine], then why are we saying that Russia has a right to conduct this draft and deport people to fight in this draft and to fight in Ukraine? I don’t understand how you put those two policies side by side."

Russians heading to South Korea by boat in hopes of evading Putin's mobilization have been denied entry in most cases.

In December 2022, Kazakhstan reportedly deported a Russian citizen, a former presidential guard, who fled mobilization; Kazakhstan denied his asylum claim in late November while human rights activists have said that the country's law on refugees allows him to stay in Kazakhstan while his lawyers appeal. Kazakhstan and Kyrgyzstan agreed to share personal data of Russians fleeing mobilization and persecution with the Russian government.

Russian independent media outlet Mediazona reported that military courts have received thousands of AWOL cases since Russia's 2022 mobilization. As of 2024, France was the only EU country accepting Russian deserters without a passport and allowing them to apply for asylum.

==== Protests ====
The Vesna movement called for wide-ranging protest action. The action called "No mogilization (grave-ization)" was scheduled for the evening of 21 September.

Protests against the mobilization for the war with Ukraine occurred throughout Russia. Protesters in Moscow chanted the slogan "Putin to the trenches!" As of 22:00 Moscow time on 21 September, more than 1,233 people had already been detained in 38 cities. Moscow police intelligence received that the detained men were handed summons to the military registration and enlistment office. Peskov noted that the delivery of subpoenas to detainees did not contradict the law. In Sokolinaya Gora, a detainee was threatened with a criminal case and 10-year prison sentence for refusing to receive a summons. The Moscow prosecutor's office warned organizing or participating in anti-war protests could lead to up to 15 years in prison.

In Grozny several dozen women tried to hold a protest rally against mobilization. All of them were detained.

On 22 September, in Babayurt, Republic of Dagestan, the federal highway was blocked at the exit from the village. A group of villagers gathered near the local military registration and enlistment office, where there was a clash between them and a government employee.

On 24 September, anti-mobilization rallies organized by Vesna took place in many Russian cities. The rallies were marked by mass detentions not only of protesters, but also of ordinary passers-by. According to OVD-Info, more than 750 people were detained by 22:30 Moscow Time.

On 25 September, the women of Yakutsk went to a rally under the slogans "We will not give up our husbands," "No to genocide," and "No to war." People gathered in osuokhay, a traditional round dance symbolizing the blessing of mothers for the safe return of their husbands and sons. The women were soon dispersed by the security forces. On the same day, residents of Endirey, Dagestan, took part in a rally against mobilization. The police fired live rounds into the air in an attempt to disperse the rally.

On 26 September, a man set himself on fire at the Ryazan bus station. On 30 September, rapper Walkie T committed suicide, saying in a video posted to Telegram that he refused to kill another man.

On 5 October 2022, recently mobilized Russian soldiers protested in Belgorod Oblast over their poor living conditions and lack of equipment.

On 15 October 2022, relatives of men drafted from the Bryansk Oblast released a video appeal to Vladimir Putin, asking him to intervene to bring their sons and husbands back home.

In November 2023, wives, and mothers of mobilized men protested in several Russian cities for their demobilization. They faced pressure and intimidation from state authorities.

On 31 May 2024, Russia’s Justice Ministry added the women's organization Put’ Domoi (The Way Home), a group of wives, mothers and sisters of soldiers who campaign for the return of mobilized men from Ukraine, to the list of so-called ‘foreign agents.’

==== Attacks ====
After the announcement of mobilization, Alexei Navalny's legal team promised to render assistance to anyone who would try to evade conscription. According to Ivan Zhdanov, Navalny's headquarters would support any form of protest over mobilization, including arson of military registration offices throughout the country.

On 21 September, a recruiting station was set on fire in Nizhny Novgorod. On the night of 21–22 September in Lomonosov, Saint Petersburg, a registration office was set on fire. In the city of Gay, Orenburg Oblast, unknown people also tried to set fire to a military recruitment building. In Tolyatti, an unknown person threw a Molotov cocktail at the city hall building.

On 23 September, it was reported that military recruitment offices were set on fire in the cities of Svobodny, Khabarovsk, Kamyshin, and the village of Tselinnoye.

On 24 September, the military office in Kansk and the office of United Russia in Salavat were set on fire.

On 25 September, there were attempts to set fire to registration offices in Ruzayevka, Chernyakhovsk, Kirovsk, village administrations in Bereslavka (Volgograd Oblast) and Syaskelevo (Leningrad Oblast), and in Uryupinsk and Tarusa.

On 26 September, during a meeting with recently mobilized recruits in Ust-Ilimsk (Irkutsk Oblast), a man opened fire at the head of the draft board, who ended up in intensive care. According to local media, before opening fire, the attacker said, "Now we’ll all go home!"

=== In Ukraine ===
Ukrainian President Volodymyr Zelenskyy called on Russians to not submit to "criminal mobilization," saying "Russian commanders do not care about the lives of Russians—they just need to replenish the empty spaces left by the dead, wounded, those who fled, or the Russian soldiers that were captured." Ukrainian authorities said that Russians forcibly mobilized and sent to Ukraine could surrender. According to the Ukrainian Deputy Prime Minister Iryna Vereshchuk, those who surrender will be guaranteed security. In a statement issued by the Ukrainian Presidential Office on 24 September, President Zelenskyy outlined a three-point promise to any Russian soldier who chooses to surrender:

1. "First, you will be treated in a civilized manner, in accordance with all conventions."
2. "Second, no one will know the circumstances of your surrender, no one in Russia will know that your surrender was voluntary."
3. "And third, if you are afraid to return to Russia and do not want an exchange, we will find a way to ensure this as well."

He ended this outline saying that "Ukraine will do everything for its victory" and that "no tricks will help the occupier."

Oleksiy Danilov, Secretary of the National Security and Defense Council of Ukraine, called the decision on partial mobilization a "complex program for the disposal of Russians." In an interview with Bild, Zelenskyy noted that Ukraine was waiting for such a step from Putin, summarizing: "Putin wants to drown Ukraine in blood. But also in the blood of their own soldiers."

For Ukrainian society, the Russian mobilization did not enter national news, as it had been discussed since the start of the conflict. Online, the news was met with memes about the "couch troops of the Russian Federation" (people who called for a tougher war online and now have the opportunity to actually go to the front and put their ideas into practice) and compensation for the families of Russian military casualties.

Anton Herashchenko, an advisor to Ukraine's Minister of Internal Affairs, estimated that Russia would begin a new wave of mobilization in January 2023.

=== International ===
Government representatives and diplomats from European countries and the United States described Putin's decision to mobilize as a sign of Russia's failure in the war with Ukraine, a step toward escalation, and an indication of panic in the Russian leadership. Some representatives noted that their governments will continue to provide military assistance to Ukraine to protect against Russian aggression. Other Western politicians have also expressed disregard of Putin's threats of nuclear escalation.

- On 1 July 2025, Azerbaijani authorities arrested eight Russian nationals who appeared in court in Baku with obvious signs of beatings, in apparent retaliation for the deaths of two Azerbaijanis in police custody in Yekaterinburg. Some of the Russian detainees were identified as IT professionals who fled to Azerbaijan after Russia announced partial mobilization in 2022.
- Czech Foreign Minister Jan Lipavský stated that the Czech Republic will not issue humanitarian visas to Russians who have fled to avoid mobilization. The Czech Republic stopped issuing visas to Russian citizens in February 2022.
- Prime Minister of Estonia Kaja Kallas announced that the country would not provide asylum to Russians fleeing mobilization. Kallas said that "every citizen is responsible for the actions of their state, and citizens of Russia are no exception. Therefore, we do not give asylum to Russian men who flee their country. They should oppose the war."
- (France) French President Emmanuel Macron said he had "no rational explanation" for the steps of Vladimir Putin in Ukraine, adding that it was likely "a combination of ressentiment, the strategy of hegemony in the region, and, I would say, the consequences of COVID-19, isolation."
- German Chancellor Olaf Scholz called the mobilization "an act of desperation" that will "make everything worse," noting that he "completely underestimated" from the beginning the willingness of the Ukrainian people to resist. German Interior Minister Nancy Faeser said that "Deserters threatened with serious repression can, as a rule, obtain international protection in Germany." However, in 2024, German authorities ordered the deportation of Russian nationals who wanted to avoid mobilization and criticized Putin's government on the grounds that they would not face persecution in Russia.
- In response to the move, the IDF issued an order to return to Israel all Israeli soldiers who are on vacation in Russia and a blanket ban on departures from Israel to Russia for IDF soldiers. In addition, the Israeli Foreign Ministry issued a travel warning for Israelis with Russian citizenship to Russia, warning them that they could be conscripted.
- Kazakh President Kassym-Jomart Tokayev stated that Kazakhstan would help fleeing Russians, saying that "Most of them are forced to leave because of the current hopeless situation." However, in December 2022, Kazakhstan deported back to Russia a Russian citizen who fled mobilization. Kazakhstan said it would extradite Russians wanted for evading mobilization. In January 2023, Kazakhstan announced they were tightening visa rules, a move that is expected to make it more difficult for Russians to remain in the country.
- Former President of Mongolia Tsakhiagiin Elbegdorj spoke on behalf of the World Mongol Federation honouring Russian refugees bound to "start freeing [their] country from dictatorship" and welcoming Buryats, Tuvans, and Kalmyks "used as nothing more than cannon fodder." According to him, different countries should accept representatives of small nationalities whom the Russian authorities send to war. In particular, Mongolia is ready to shelter refugees.
- (Netherlands) Dutch Prime Minister Mark Rutte called Putin's actions a "sign of panic," adding that the threat of nuclear weapons did not worry him.
- In an interview with PBS News, President of Poland Andrzej Duda called the mobilization "an attempt to save face" by Russia.
- (United Kingdom) British Secretary of State for Defense Ben Wallace said that the mobilization is evidence of Russia's defeat.
- United States Ambassador to Ukraine Bridget A. Brink noted that "fake referendums and mobilization are signs of Russia's weakness and failure." Speaking at the United Nations Security Council, Secretary of State Antony J. Blinken castigated Putin for "choosing not to end the war but to expand it" through the mobilization, escalatory threats, and annexation "to add fuel to the fire that he started." He reminded the council of the protest and resistance among the Russian people, quoting the anti-mobilization protesters' chant of "Let our children live."

Germany offered asylum to Russian oppositionists and conscripts who did not want to go to war with Ukraine. In contrast, the Finnish Foreign Ministry said that the country is preparing to introduce a complete ban on entry for Russian citizens on Schengen Visas. Estonia announced that they would close entry for all Russians who participated in the war with Ukraine, and Latvia refused to issue humanitarian visas to Russians who evade mobilization, citing security concerns.

== Analysis ==
According to the Institute for the Study of War, mobilization is unlikely to allow Russia to significantly increase its combat power. According to lawyer Alexei Tabalov, writing for The Insider, one of the objectives of amending the laws on desertion was the "enslavement of military personnel at the front."

Other experts say that Russia suffers from a lack of infrastructure to train and equip the mobilized, caused by heavy losses of equipment and ammunition on the battlefield and the abolition of many logistics and management structures that once allowed the countries of the former Soviet Union to quickly train and arm mobilized conscripts. Jean-Christophe Noël, associate researcher at IFRI, said that "one of the Russian weaknesses is joint-army combats and their reservists are not at all prepared for that. They would be used as cannon fodder in any attempt at an offensive."

The Washington Post noted that by announcing the mobilization, Putin took a big risk—according to polls, young men may begin to express opposition to the war due to the mobilization decree. According to the analysis of economists Oleg Itskhoki and Maxim Mironov, Russia may lose more than 10% of men aged 20–29 as a result of losses in the war and emigration. After the end of the war, Russia expects a surge in crime. Also, a significant number of children, especially in poor regions, will be left without fathers, which will lead to a new surge in crime in 5–10 years, when these children become teenagers.

Doug Klain, a nonresident fellow at the Atlantic Council’s Eurasia Center, wrote that "Sending untrained, underequipped, and largely unwilling men to fight in Ukraine will be a slaughter with little precedent in modern war fighting... In the United States, new Army recruits need 10 weeks of basic training, at a bare minimum, to be ready for combat." Gustaf Gressel, a senior policy fellow at the Berlin office of the European Council on Foreign Relations, said that "my gut feeling is that Putin doesn't really care about the inferior quality [of new troops being assembled]." So my guess is that the overall aim of this is to make Ukraine run out of bullets before Russia runs out of soldiers."

=== Casualties ===
As of 5 July 2024, BBC News Russian and Mediazona confirmed by name that a total of 7,152 Russians who were mobilized had been killed, of which 54 died within Russia due to various accidents. With 7,152 mobilized personnel having been confirmed killed, mobilized fatalities account for 12.2 per cent of all identified Russian personnel who have been confirmed killed by BBC News Russian and Mediazona. Due to the fog of war and deliberate misinformation campaigns on both sides, the real number of mobilized recruits killed in Ukraine is unknown.

Newly mobilized soldiers from the Samara Oblast were among those killed in Ukrainian shelling of the Makiivka military quarters on New Year's Eve on 31 December 2022. Ukraine claimed the attack killed up to 400 Russian soldiers and wounded 300 others. The attack was carried out using HIMARS rockets. By 13 February 2023, BBC News Russian and Mediazona had identified the names of 107 mobilized Russians who had been killed during the shelling.

Military experts speaking to the Wall Street Journal stated that the heavy Russian losses in the Battle of Vuhledar indicated orders to soldiers were coming from the top down, combined with very little training of the mobilized soldiers. Analysts believed many of the Russian casualties and loss of equipment stemmed from the makeup of the Russian brigades, which were predominantly untrained mobilized recruits.

== See also ==
- 2022 mobilization in the Donetsk People's Republic and the Luhansk People's Republic
- "Address concerning the events in Ukraine" – televised speech by Putin recognizing the Donetsk and Luhansk republics
- "On conducting a special military operation" – televised speech by Putin announcing the use of force against Ukraine
- Martial law in Russia
  - 2022 Russian martial law
- Mobilization in Ukraine
- Reserve of the Supreme High Command
- State of emergency in Russia
- 2022 Ukrainian mobilization
