= Bereslavka, Russia =

Bereslavka Береславка
- Settlement
- Location within Volgograd Oblast Location within Russia
- Coordinates: 48°37′N 44°03′E
- Country: Russia
- Region: Volgograd Oblast
- District: Kalachyovsky District
- Time zone: UTC+4:00

Bereslavka (Russian: Береславка) is a rural locality (a settlement) and the administrative center of Bereslavskoye Rural Settlement, Kalachyovsky District, Volgograd Oblast, Russia. The population was 4,616 as of 2010. There are 39 streets.

== Geography ==
Bereslavka is located on south bank of the Bereslavskoye Reservoir, 46 km east of Kalach-na-Donu (the district's administrative centre) by road. Novy Rogachik is the nearest rural locality.
