= Bien Hoa Base Camp =

Former U.S. military base in southern Vietnam

Site information
- Type: Army Base
- Condition: abandoned

Location
- Coordinates: 10.984°N 106.834°E

Site history
- In use: 1965–75
- Battles/wars: Vietnam War

Garrison information
- Occupants: 173rd Airborne Brigade

Bien Hoa Base Camp (also known as Bien Hoa Army Base) is a former U.S. Army and Army of the Republic of Vietnam (ARVN) base northeast of Biên Hòa in Đồng Nai province, southern Vietnam.

== History ==
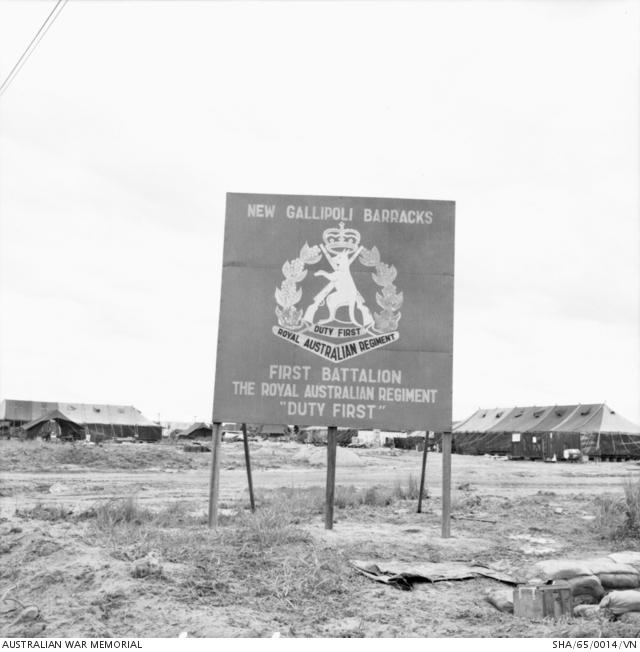
Sign for 1RAR's New Gallipoli Barracks at Bien Hoa

From 3 to 6 May 1965 United States Air Force (USAF) transport aircraft deployed the 173rd Airborne Brigade from Okinawa to Bien Hoa Air Base to secure the air base and surrounding areas and the port of Vũng Tàu. The 173rd established their base on the northeast perimeter of the air base so that the men could occupy the local high ground facing War Zone D, from where Viet Cong (VC) attacks were deemed likely to come. The soldiers quickly went to work building bunkers for protection against mortars, digging trenches, clearing fields of fire, and erecting barbed wire barriers. From the bunkers and trenches the soldiers could see about 200m of open area, which then gave way to thick brush and, ultimately, to jungle farther north. At first, the soldiers lived in pup tents. These were gradually replaced by larger tents and then by more permanent structures.

In June and July they were joined by the 1st Battalion, Royal Australian Regiment and a New Zealand Artillery Battery attached as the third battery of the U.S. 3rd Battalion, 319th Field Artillery Regiment. The allied units were under the operational control of the 173rd until April 1966 when they were given their own tactical area of responsibility (TAOR) in Phước Tuy Province.

On 15 March 1971 a grenade was tossed into an officer billet at the base killing 1st Cavalry Division (Airmobile) Lieutenants Thomas A. Dellwo and Richard E. Harlan. Private Billy Dean Smith was charged with the murders, but was acquitted at a court-martial in November 1972.

Other units stationed at Bien Hoa included:

- 5th Special Forces Group, Detachment C-3
- Special Forces Detachment 60
- MIKE Force A-302
- 101st Airborne Division Screaming Eagle Replacement Training School (SERTS)
- 1st Cavalry Division replacement training center
- Military Assistance Command, Vietnam advisors Teams 95 and 98
- Army of the Republic of Vietnam 3rd Rangers
