= 1984 JSDF Yamaguchi training ground shooting incident =

1984 shooting in Yamaguchi, Japan

- Location: 34°11′19″N 131°29′07″E; JGSDF Yamaguchi Garrison, Yamaguchi, Yamaguchi Prefecture, Japan
- Date: 27 February 1984 (JST, UTC+09:00)
- Target: Military personnel
- Attack type: Mass shooting
- Deaths: 1
- Injuries: 4
- Motive: Fragging
- Accused: Ground Self-Defense Force male member

On February 27, 1984, during a training exercise, a Self-Defense Force member opened fire on his fellow soldiers with a service rifle at a shooting range near the Japan Ground Self-Defense Force (JGSDF) Yamaguchi Garrison, Yamaguchi Prefecture.

== Attacks ==
Around noon on February 27, 1984, during a live-fire training exercise at the Yamaguchi Training Range, located near the JGSDF Yamaguchi Garrison, a 21-year-old Private Second Class (referred to here as “A”) assigned to the JGSDF 17th Infantry Regiment suddenly turned and opened fire on his fellow trainees using a Type 64 rifle. Of the approximately 60 personnel present, four were wounded, and one of them, an 18-year-old soldier, died the following day from his injuries.

After the shooting, A fled the scene in a jeep, still armed with the rifle. The JGSDF and Yamaguchi Prefectural Police launched a manhunt and apprehended A at around 4:40 p.m. that same day in Yamaguchi City.

== Suspect ==
"A" reportedly stated that he had acted out of long-standing frustration and resentment from being mocked by his peers, saying, “I didn't care what happened anymore.” However, he was later deemed to be in a state of diminished mental capacity due to severe depression and was not prosecuted. Instead, he was committed to a psychiatric hospital.

"A" had originally joined the JGSDF in June 1983. At the time of enlistment, he was reported to have performed well on intelligence tests, and there were no immediate concerns about his suitability for service. Prior to this, he had dropped out of a private university in Osaka Prefecture and initially enlisted in the 109th Training Battalion in Ōtsu, Shiga Prefecture, in September 1981. He was later stationed in Himeji, but in July 1982, he was absent without leave and spent time traveling around the Kansai region. As a result, he received a six-day suspension and voluntarily resigned from the service.

Following the incident, "A" was dishonorably discharged. The incident also prompted disciplinary actions against 24 senior JGSDF officials, ranging from pay cuts to formal warnings. Haruo Natsume, the Administrative Vice Minister of Defense, received an official reprimand.

== See also ==
- 2023 Japan military facility shooting
- Kawase Ekimae police shooting incident
- Higashifuji Training Area Illegal Shooting Incident
- Duty to take safety precautions in JSDF
- 2009 Fort Hood shooting
- 2014 Fort Hood shootings
- Arkankergen massacre
- Soloti military training ground shooting
- Gorny shooting
- List of massacres in Japan
