= Fragging =

Deliberate killing or attempted killing of a soldier by a fellow soldier

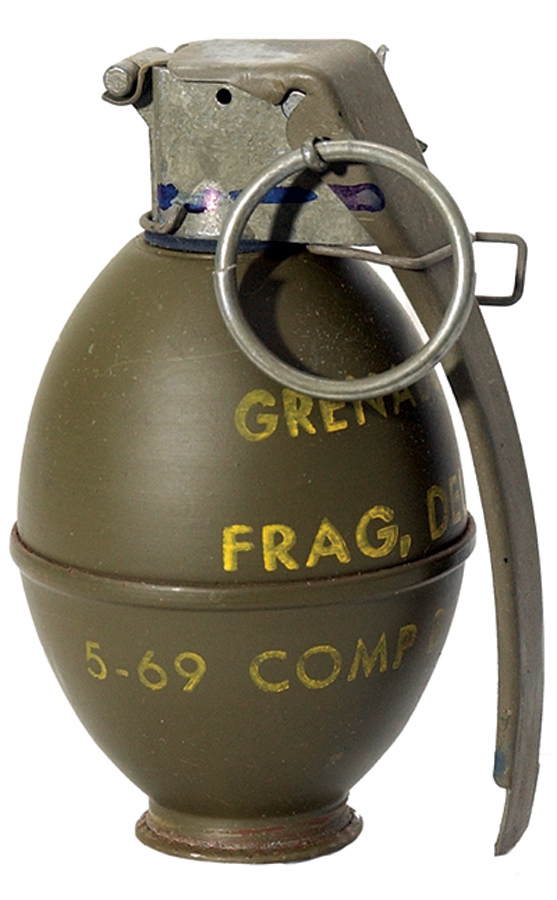
M26 "fragmentation" grenade, issued to the U.S. Army and U.S. Marines in the Vietnam War, used in many fragging incidents.

Fragging is the deliberate killing or attempted killing of a soldier, usually a superior, by a fellow soldier. U.S. military personnel coined the word during the Vietnam War, when such killings were most often committed or attempted with a fragmentation grenade, to make it appear that the killing was accidental or during combat with the enemy. The term fragging now encompasses any deliberate killing of military colleagues.

The high number of fragging incidents in the latter years of the Vietnam War was symptomatic of discontent that existed among some military personnel and of a breakdown of discipline in parts of the U.S. Armed Forces. Documented and suspected fragging incidents using explosives totaled 904 from 1969 to 1972, although this number is considered an underestimation. In addition, hundreds of fragging incidents using firearms took place, but were hard to quantify as they were indistinguishable from combat deaths and poorly documented. It has even been called the "Army's 'other war' in Vietnam", the "battle with the insurgents in its own ranks", by the author and Vietnam veteran David Cortright in his systematic study of soldiers in revolt during that war. Cortright also argues that "assaults against commanders during the Vietnam War probably reached into the thousands."

Fragging is distinct from the unintentional killing or wounding of comrades or allied personnel. Such incidents are referred to as friendly fire, also commonly known as a "blue on blue" (a term that dates back to the time of the American Civil War).

== Motivation ==
Soldiers have killed colleagues since the beginning of armed conflict, with many documented instances throughout history. However, the practice of fragging seems to have been relatively uncommon in the U.S. military until the Vietnam War. The prevalence of fragging was partially based on the ready availability of explosive weapons such as fragmentation hand grenades. Grenades were untraceable to an owner and left no ballistic evidence. M18 Claymore mines and other explosives were also occasionally used in fragging, as were firearms, although the term, as defined by the military during the Vietnam War, initially applied only to the use of explosives to kill fellow soldiers. Most fragging incidents were in the Army and Marine Corps. Fragging was rare in the Navy and Air Force where there was less access to grenades and weapons. There were, however, numerous cases of "fodding" or "foreign-object damage to highly technical and complicated machinery."

The first known incidents of fragging in South Vietnam took place in 1966, but events in 1968 appear to have catalyzed an increase in fragging. After the Tet Offensive in January and February 1968, the Vietnam War became increasingly unpopular in the United States and among American soldiers in Vietnam, many of them conscripts. Secondly, racial tensions between white and black soldiers and Marines increased after the assassination of Martin Luther King Jr. in April 1968. With troops reluctant to risk their lives in what was perceived as an unjust or lost war, fragging was seen by some enlisted men "as the most effective way to discourage their superiors from showing enthusiasm for combat". Cortright called it a "tool of soldier democracy" and a way "to resist military authority." He said it "was a final manifestation of a breakdown in the U.S. mission in Vietnam and signaled an Army at war with itself."

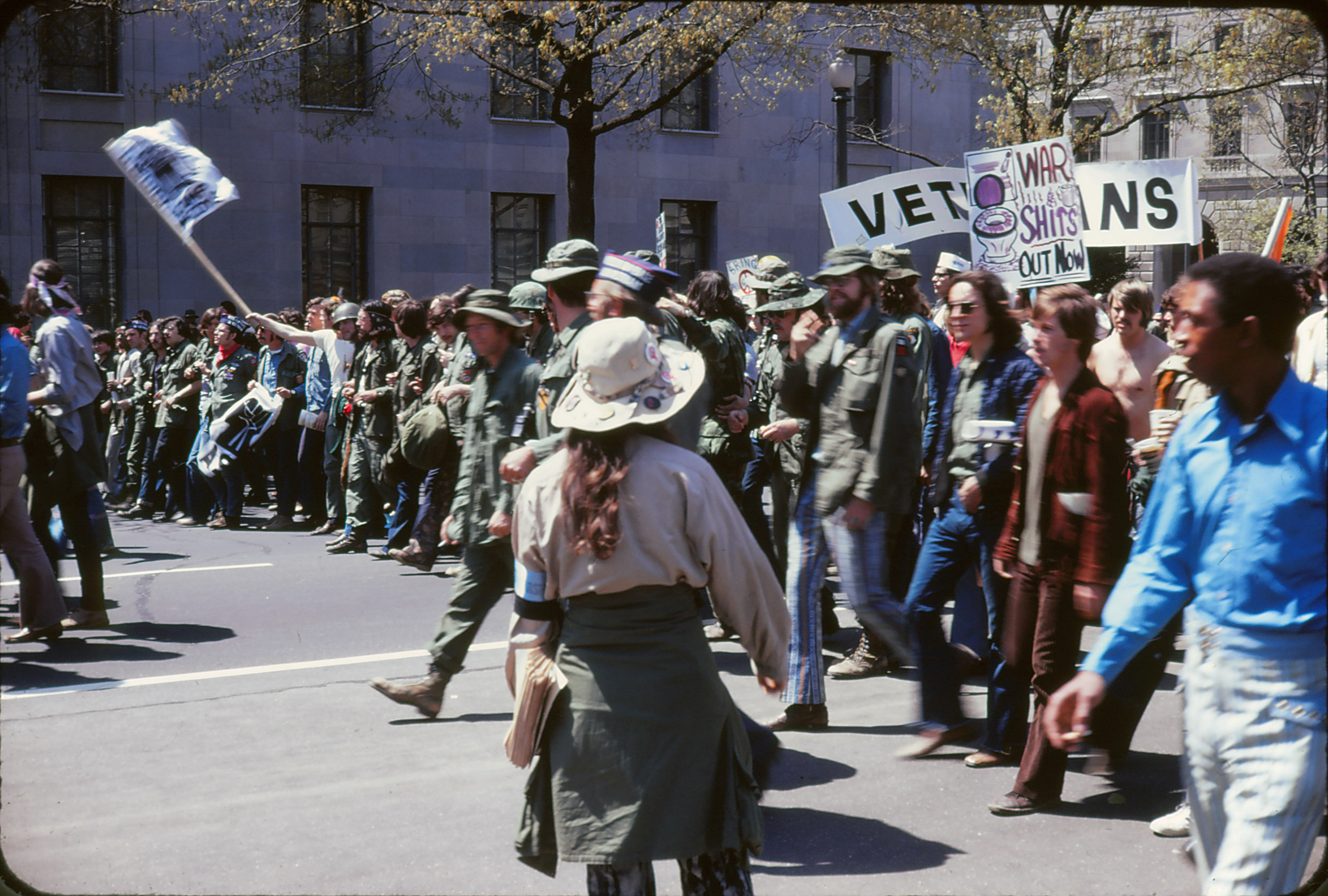
G.I. movement veterans protesting the Vietnam War.

Toward the end of the war, morale plummeted among soldiers and Marines. In 1971, a USMC colonel declared in the Armed Forces Journal that "The morale, discipline, and battle worthiness of the U.S. Armed Forces are, with a few salient exceptions, lower and worse than at any time in this century and possibly in the history of the United States."

The U.S. military reflected social problems and issues in the U.S. such as racism, drug abuse, and resentment toward authoritarian leaders. As the U.S. began to withdraw its military forces from Vietnam, some American enlisted men and young officers lost their sense of purpose for being in Vietnam, and the hierarchical relationship between enlisted men and their officers deteriorated. The resentment directed from enlisted men toward older officers was exacerbated by generational gaps, as well as different perceptions of how the military should conduct itself. Enforcement of military regulations, especially if done overzealously, led to complaints and sometimes threats of physical violence directed toward officers.

A number of additional factors may have influenced the incidence of fragging. The demand for manpower for the war in Vietnam caused the armed forces to lower their standards for inducting both officers and enlisted men. The rapid rotation of personnel, especially of officers who served (on average) less than six months in command roles, decreased the stability and cohesion of military units. Most important of all, perhaps, was the loss of purpose or sense of justice in fighting the war. Increasing disillusionment led to a further deterioration of morale and discipline.

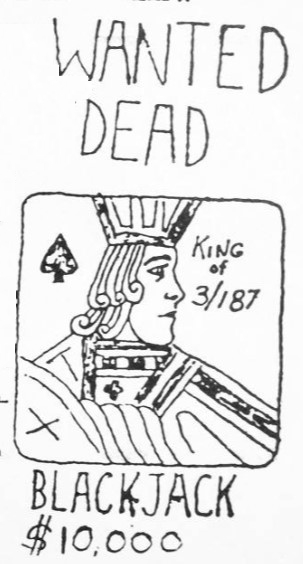
$10,000 reward as reported in GI Says underground newspaper in South Vietnam 1969

Most fragging was perpetrated by enlisted men against officers. Enlisted men, in the words of one company commander, "feared they would get stuck with a lieutenant or platoon sergeant who would want to carry out all kinds of crazy John Wayne tactics, who would use their lives in an effort to win the war single-handedly, win the big medal, and get his picture in the hometown paper". Harassment of subordinates by a superior was another frequent motive. The stereotypical fragging incident was of "an aggressive career officer being assaulted by disillusioned subordinates". Several fragging incidents resulted from alleged racism between black and white soldiers. Attempts by officers to control drug use caused others. Most known fragging incidents were carried out by soldiers in support units rather than soldiers in combat units.

Soldiers sometimes used non-lethal smoke and tear-gas grenades to warn superiors that they were in more serious danger if they did not change their behavior. If this proved unsuccessful, a fragmentation grenade could deliver the final message. A few instances occurred—and many more were rumored—in which enlisted men pooled their money for "bounties" on particular officers or non-commissioned officers to reward soldiers for fragging them. The most famous of these occurred after the controversial Battle of Hamburger Hill in 1969 when a $10,000 bounty was placed in the GI underground newspaper GI Says for the murder of the commander of the 3rd Battalion, 187th Infantry (3/187), whose military handle was "Blackjack".

== U.S. Forces in Vietnam ==
Known U.S. fragging incidents using explosives in Vietnam
	1969	1970	1971	1972
Army	96	209	222	28
Marine Corps	30+	50+	30+	5
Suspected	30	62	111	31
Total	156+	321+	363+	64
Deaths	46	38	12	3
Note: Statistics were not kept before 1969.

According to author George Lepre, the total number of known and suspected fragging cases using explosives in Vietnam from 1969 to 1972 totalled 904, with 99 deaths and many injuries. This total is incomplete, as some cases were not reported, nor were statistics kept before 1969 (although several incidents from 1966 to 1968 are known). Most of the victims or intended victims were officers or non-commissioned officers. The number of fraggings increased in 1970 and 1971 even though the U.S. military was withdrawing and the number of U.S. military personnel in Vietnam was declining.

An earlier calculation by authors Richard A. Gabriel and Paul L. Savage, estimated that up to 1,017 fragging incidents may have taken place in Vietnam, causing 86 deaths and 714 injuries of U.S. military personnel, the majority officers and NCOs.

By the end of the war, at least 450 officers were killed in fraggings; the U.S. military reported at least 600 U.S. soldiers killed in fragging incidents with another 1,400 dying under mysterious circumstances.

Fragging statistics include only incidents involving explosives, most commonly grenades. Several hundred murders of U.S. soldiers by firearms occurred in Vietnam but most were of enlisted men killing other enlisted men of nearly equal rank. Fewer than ten officers are known to have been murdered by firearms. However, rumors and claims abound of the deliberate killing of officers and non-commissioned officers by enlisted men under battlefield conditions. The frequency and number of these fraggings, indistinguishable from combat deaths, cannot be quantified.

=== Response ===
The U.S. military's responses to fragging incidents included greater restrictions on access to weapons, especially grenades, for soldiers in non-combat units and post-fragging "lockdowns" in which a whole unit was isolated until after an investigation. For example, in May 1971, the U.S. Army in Vietnam temporarily halted the issuance of grenades to nearly all units and soldiers in Vietnam, inventoried stocks of weapons, and searched soldiers' quarters, confiscating weapons, ammunition, grenades, and knives. This, however, failed to reduce fragging incidents as soldiers could easily obtain weapons in a flourishing black market among nearby Vietnamese communities. Moreover, by stripping soldiers of the weapons to fight, the Army further demoralized its own troops and undermined the U.S. role in the war. The U.S. military also attempted to diminish adverse publicity concerning fragging and the security measures it was taking to reduce it.

Only a few fraggers were identified and prosecuted. It was often difficult to distinguish between fragging and enemy action. A grenade thrown into a foxhole or tent could be a fragging, or the action of an enemy infiltrator or saboteur. Enlisted men were often close-mouthed in fragging investigations, refusing to inform on their colleagues out of fear or solidarity. Sentences for fragging convictions were severe—but the few men convicted often served fairly brief prison sentences. Ten fraggers were convicted of murder and served sentences from ten months to thirty years. Perhaps the most well known fragging case was that of Private Billy Dean Smith who was court-martialed by the U.S. Army in 1972 on charges of the premeditated murder of two officers and premeditated attempted murder of two other officers in Vietnam on March 15, 1971. All of the officers were white and Smith was Black. Smith claimed he was charged because of his open opposition to the war, which he felt was racist, and to racism within the military. After a well publicised court-martial, Smith was found non-guilty on all charges.

=== Influence ===
In the Vietnam War, the threat of fragging caused many officers and NCOs to go armed in rear areas and to change their sleeping arrangements as fragging often consisted of throwing a grenade into a tent where the target was sleeping. For fear of being fragged, some leaders turned a blind eye to drug use and other indiscipline among the men in their charge. Fragging, the threat of fragging, and investigations of fragging sometimes disrupted or delayed tactical combat operations. Officers were sometimes forced to negotiate with their enlisted men to obtain their consent before undertaking dangerous patrols. The ultimate effect of fragging in Vietnam was its impact on the functioning of the U.S. Army. For every known instance of fragging, there were "many instances of intimidation and threats of fragging" which could convince a commander to behave differently. "Once a commander was threatened by or became the actual target of a fragging, his effectiveness and that of the unit involved were severely hampered." It "signaled an Army at war with itself."

The breakdown of discipline, including fragging, was an important influence on the U.S. change to an all-volunteer military in place of conscription. The last conscript was inducted into the army in 1973. The volunteer military moderated some of the coercive methods of discipline previously used to maintain order in military ranks.

== Coalition forces in Afghanistan ==
During the war in Afghanistan (2001–2021) hundreds of coalition soldiers were intentionally killed by Islamic Republic of Afghanistan forces. Increases in insider attacks against coalition forces were noted after high-profile provocations such as the 2012 Afghanistan Quran burning protests and the Kandahar massacre.

In 2012, according to NATO, 51 coalition service members died due to the deliberate actions by members of the Afghan forces. Another 65 NATO soldiers were killed in insider attacks between 2007 and 2011. The increase in so-called "green-on-blue attacks" prompted U.S. officials to revamp the screening process of potential Afghan recruits as Afghan military leadership identified "hundreds" of Afghan soldiers within their ranks who were linked to the Taliban insurgency or harbored anti-American views.

Most of the attackers in these incidents were members of the special Afghan Local Police (ALP) units, who operated as a local tribal force and were known to have ties to the Taliban. They were also known to use drugs and were sometimes reported for abusing civilians.

The Long War Journal reported on such attacks, counting 155 since 2008 to June 11, 2017, resulting in 152 Coalition dead and 193 wounded. ANA fighters sometimes fled to the Taliban, which posted videos 'welcoming' the fleeing fighters. NATO commanders initially stated that an estimated 90% of the attacks were due to cultural differences and personal enmity, while the Afghan government disagreed and blamed the problem on "infiltration by foreign spy agencies", including those of "neighboring countries".

To reduce insider attacks, joint operations between U.S. and Afghan forces were reduced and coalition soldiers were reminded to be respectful.

== Notable incidents ==
- 217: Roman emperor Caracalla while leading his army stopped to urinate roadside and was stabbed by a disgruntled soldier, Justin Martialis. Martialis was motivated by Caracalla's refusal to promote him to centurion, and the manipulations of Macrinus, who succeeded Caracalla.
- 1704: Battle of Blenheim: An unpopular major in Sir William Clifton's Regiment of Foot of the English Army was shot in the head by his own men after the battle had been won.
- 1718: Charles XII of Sweden was shot and killed during the siege of Halden; the shot was possibly fired by one of his own soldiers.
- Jacobite rising of 1745: On 31 August 1746, Captain George Munro, 1st of Culcairn, who was leading raids into Lochaber in the aftermath of the Battle of Culloden, was shot dead by a concealed gunman along Loch Arkaig in Clan Cameron country. Even though other suspects within Clan Cameron have been named, underground Roman Catholic Bishop John Geddes believed Captain Munro's death to have been a deliberate fragging by a disgruntled subordinate, whom Munro had recently had flogged.
- 1777: Battles of Saratoga: Lieutenant-Colonel Heinrich von Breymann, who led Brunswick troops in the conflict, was so disgusted with the performance of his men during the battle that he began attacking them with his sabre; one of his men, after being injured, pulled out a pistol and shot von Breymann dead.
- 1798: After Revolutionary France invaded Switzerland, Karl Ludwig von Erlach was appointed supreme commander of the Swiss Army by the Confederation's War Council. After the French victory at Battle of Grauholz, Erlach was murdered by his troops, who mistakenly believed he was a traitor.
- 1815: Battle of Quatre Bras: The colonel of the 92nd (Gordon Highlanders) Regiment of Foot, John Cameron of Fassfern, was shot dead by one of the regiment's soldiers whom he had recently flogged.
- 1847: Mexican–American War: Lieutenant Colonel Braxton Bragg (later a Confederate general) survived two attempts on his life: in each case, an artillery shell exploded under his bed.
- 1894: Battle of the Yalu River: Qing Admiral Ding Ruchang's legs were crushed, either due to a construction defect or the deliberate misfiring of his ship's main battery by the ship's captain.
- February 27, 1984: A Japan Ground Self-Defense soldier went on a shooting spree by firing on his squadron on the target shooting range at Camp Yamaguchi: one was killed and three injured.
- July 6, 1999: U.S. Army soldier Barry Winchell was beaten to death with a baseball bat while he slept outside of his barracks by Calvin Glover for dating a transgender woman.
- November 5, 2009: U.S. Army major and psychiatrist Nidal Hasan went on a shooting spree at Fort Hood: he shot dead 13 fellow soldiers and wounded 32 before being shot and paralyzed from the waist down. On August 23, 2013, he was convicted of 13 counts of premeditated murder and 32 counts of attempted premeditated murder, and was sentenced to death on August 28, 2013.
- May 28, 2012: A Kazakh border guard took his rifle and opened fire on his unit at the Kazakh-Chinese border, with 15 men being shot dead.
- September 16, 2013: U.S. Navy petty officer Aaron Alexis went on a shooting spree at Washington Navy Yard using a Remington Model 870 shotgun and a Beretta M9 pistol, killing 12 people and injuring eight before being shot dead by responding police officers.
- November 4, 2016: A Jordanian Army soldier, 1st Sergeant Marik al-Tuwayha, stationed at the King Faisal Air Base in Jordan opened fire on American soldiers attempting to enter a checkpoint. The resulting shootout led to the deaths of three American soldiers, and ended when another American soldier shot and critically wounded al-Tuwayha. al-Tuwayha was sentenced to life in prison.
- October 25, 2019: A Russian Army soldier gunned down eight people and injured two more during a shooting at the Gorny military base.
- October 15, 2022: Two Russian soldiers went on a shooting spree at Soloti military base using automatic rifles; they shot dead 11 people and injured 15 before being shot dead by military police.
- June 14, 2023: A Japan Ground Self-Defense Force soldier shot three people in an ambush at the basic firing range in Gifu; two were killed and one was wounded.

=== World War II ===
- 1941: Captain Iain Macleod shot at the locked door his superior, Deputy Assistant Adjutant General Alan Dawtry, in a drunken rage after demanding Dawtry play stud poker with him.
- December 27, 1942: In Great Britain, Lieutenant Robert James Cobner directed Private David Cobb, who was on guard duty, to assist in the moving of the beds: Private Cobb refused and complained that he had already worked four hours longer than the other guards. After Lieutenant Cobner ordered Private Cobb to stand at attention while addressing an officer and put his uniform into proper order, Private Cobb refused. When Lieutenant Cobner ordered his arrest by the Sergeant of the Guard and directed him to hand over his rifle, Private Cobb aimed the rifle at the Sergeant of the Guard before shooting Lieutenant Cobner dead. Private Cobb was convicted of the premeditated murder of Lieutenant Cobner, sentenced to death, and executed by hanging at Shepton Mallet Prison on March 12, 1943. He was buried in Oise-Aisne American Cemetery Plot E.
- March 5, 1944: In Great Britain, after Private Alex Flores Miranda had been arrested for urinating in public, constables testified that Private Miranda had been drinking: after threatening the officers, he was released the same night to his barracks. Inside the barracks, Private Miranda became afraid that Sergeant Thomas Evison, who was sleeping, would severely punish him for the offense: he approached Sergeant Evison, awakened him, and told him to stop snoring. After Sergeant Evison ordered him to return to bed, then went back to sleep, Private Miranda left the bunk, returned with a rifle, and shot Sergeant Evison in the head as he slept. Private Miranda was convicted of the premeditated murder of Sergeant Evison, sentenced to death, and executed by firing squad at Shepton Mallet Prison on May 30, 1944. He was buried in Oise-Aisne American Cemetery Plot E. In 1990, Private Miranda's remains were returned to the United States for reburial at Santa Ana Cemetery in Santa Ana, California: this came after a review of the case indicated that while his conviction was justified, racial bias had contributed to his death sentence.
- November 18, 1944: An hour after Corporal Tommie Lee Garrett ordered Private George Green Jr. to clean up a spilled can of urine, Private Green pulled out his M1 Carbine rifle and shot Corporal Garrett dead at the United States Army base in Champigneulles, France. Private Green was convicted of the premeditated murder of Corporal Garrett, sentenced to death, and executed by hanging at Loire Disciplinary Training Center on May 15, 1945. He was buried in Oise-Aisne American Cemetery Plot E.

=== Vietnam War (U.S. forces) ===
- 1969: After the controversial U.S. casualties during the Battle of Hamburger Hill, the G.I underground newspaper "G.I Says" in Vietnam placed a $10,000 bounty on Colonel Weldon Honeycutt, leading to multiple unsuccessful fragging attempts against him.
- April 21, 1969: A grenade was thrown into the company office of K Company, 9th Marines, at Quảng Trị Combat Base, RVN, with First Lieutenant Robert T. Rohweller dying of wounds he received in the explosion. Private Reginald F. Smith, who was apprehended after boasting about the killing to a colleague in formation while still having a grenade ring on his finger, pleaded guilty to the premeditated murder of Rohweller and was sentenced to 40 years imprisonment; he was murdered by a fellow inmate in prison on July 25, 1982.
- March 15, 1971: A grenade was tossed into an officer billet at Bien Hoa Base Camp, with Lieutenants Thomas A. Dellwo and Richard E. Harlan of the 1st Cavalry Division (Airmobile) being killed. Private Billy Dean Smith was charged with the murders of the officers but was acquitted at a court-martial in November 1972.

=== Vietnam War (Australian forces) ===
- November 23, 1969: Following a night of heavy drinking within the 9th Battalion of the Royal Australian Regiment at Nui Dat, South Vietnam, a grenade was rolled into the tent of sleeping Lieutenant Robert Thomas Convery: Convery was killed in the explosion. Private Peter Denzil "Pedro" Allen was convicted of Convery's murder and sentenced to life imprisonment, serving ten years and eight months in Risdon Prison.
- December 25, 1970: Private Paul Raymond "Ramon" Ferriday took his SLR rifle and opened fire into the Sergeant's Mess of the Royal Australian Army Service Corps at Nui Dat, South Vietnam, following an all-day drinking session: Sergeants Allan Brian Moss and Wallace James Galvin were shot dead and Sergeant Frederick Edwin Bowtell was wounded. During his court-martial, an Army psychiatrist described Ferriday as having a "paranoid character" and being prone to fits of rage, despite witnesses describing him as being aware of his actions and giving details of previous threatening altercations. Ferriday was convicted on two counts of manslaughter and one count of assault with a weapon, and was sentenced to ten years imprisonment, serving eight years in Pentridge Prison.

=== Middle East peacekeeping ===
- October 27, 1982: While serving at Tebnine with the United Nations Interim Force in Lebanon, Irish Army Private Michael McAleavey dropped into a combat stance inside a concrete bunkhouse at a checkpoint before opening fire with his FN FAL battle rifle: Corporal Gregory "Gary" Morrow, Private Thomas Murphy and Private Peter Burke were shot dead. McAleavey originally told Irish Military Police investigators they had been killed in an ambush by Lebanese gunmen, but he ultimately confessed, claiming that he had "snapped" due to dehydration and heat exhaustion. McAleavey was convicted of the murders at a court-martial and was sentenced to life imprisonment, being paroled in 2010.

=== The Troubles ===
- May 9, 1992: During the reconstruction of a Royal Ulster Constabulary (RUC) security base devastated just two days before by a Provisional IRA tractor bomb at Fivemiletown, in County Tyrone, while soldiers from the First Battalion Staffordshire Regiment were providing a security detail to the workers, an 18-year-old private fired his SA80 rifle 14 times at the company's sergeant major in a frenzy, killing him in front of the rest of the platoon. The serviceman was eventually acquitted of the charge of murder in May 1993, but declared guilty of manslaughter, and given a two-year suspended sentence. There were allegations of previous hazing and bullying by the non-commissioned officer against his subordinate.

=== War in Afghanistan ===
- August 17, 2002: Following an altercation, British Army Corporal John Gregory, who was drunk and under the influence of medication, shot dead Royal Logistic Corps Sergeant Robert Busuttil as he lay in a hammock during a barbecue at Kabul International Airport before killing himself. Wiltshire coroner David Masters asked the British Army "to tighten its rules on alcohol and gun security".
- January 20, 2012: An Afghan soldier opened fire on French soldiers, killing four and injuring fifteen, eight of whom were seriously wounded. He was subsequently arrested and confessed his motivation came from a published video of American Marines urinating on dead Taliban fighters and a published video of British soldiers abusing Afghan children. The incident led French president Nicolas Sarkozy to threaten to withdraw all French forces in Afghanistan.
- August 5, 2014: During a high-ranking coalition delegation speech at the Marshal Fahim National Defense University, an Afghan soldier opened fire on a crowd of 90 Coalition officials and soldiers, leading to the death of U.S. Major General Harold J. Greene and the wounding of 14 others, including German Air Force officer Michael Bartscher, before the soldier was shot dead by two Coalition soldiers (one Danish and the other American).

=== Iraq War (U.S. forces) ===
- March 23, 2003: In Kuwait, Sergeant Hasan Karim Akbar cut power to his base and threw four hand grenades into three tents where fellow members of the 101st Airborne Division were sleeping, before opening fire with his rifle as the personnel ran to take cover: Army Captain Christopher S. Seifert and Air Force Major Gregory L. Stone were killed and fourteen other soldiers wounded. Akbar was convicted at a court-martial at Fort Bragg, North Carolina on April 21, 2005, on two counts of premeditated murder and three counts of attempted premeditated murder, and was sentenced to death on April 28.
- June 7, 2005: Captain Phillip Esposito and 1st Lieutenant Louis Allen were both killed after a Claymore mine placed on Esposito's office window was detonated at Forward Operating Base Danger in Tikrit, Iraq. The unit's supply sergeant was charged with the murders, but was acquitted at court martial.
- July 19, 2005: The death of LaVena Johnson is a suspected fragging incident. She was found dead with a broken nose, black eye, loose teeth, gunshot wound to the mouth, and burns from a corrosive chemical on her genitals. Additionally, bloody footprints were discovered outside of her living quarters. The U.S. Army ruled her death as a suicide, and denied claims by her father that she was raped and murdered. Christopher Grey, chief of public affairs for the USACIDC, accused people of spreading misinformation on the internet that she was murdered.
- September 14, 2008: Army sergeant Joseph Bozicevich killed two fellow soldiers: one of his victims was found shot seven times in the corner of the base's small communications station and another in the dirt outside with six bullets in his back. Several witnesses said they saw Bozicevich chasing one of them while firing at him and fired two shots while he stood directly over him. Witnesses also testified to hearing Bozicevich screaming "Kill me!" as he was pinned to the ground. In 2011, he was sentenced to life in prison.
- May 11, 2009: Sergeant John Russell opened fire on Camp Liberty with an M16A2 rifle and shot dead five U.S. military personnel. Russell pleaded guilty to five counts of premeditated murder and was sentenced to life in prison without the possibility of parole.
- September 7, 2010: An Iraqi soldier pulled out his weapon and opened fire on a group of U.S. soldiers after getting into an argument with one of them, leaving two dead and nine injured before the Iraqi was shot dead.
- September 23, 2010: United States Army Spc. Neftaly Platero shot dead two of his roommates and injured another who he had arguments with in Fallujah. In June 2013, he was sentenced to life in prison without the possibility of parole.
- June 12, 2011: An Iraqi soldier killed two U.S. soldiers and wounded a third after smuggling real bullets into a U.S. base training centre: he was immediately shot dead by U.S. soldiers managing the training event.

=== Royal Navy ===
- April 28, 2011: During a port visit to Southampton, Able Seaman Ryan Donovan abandoned his sentry post at the boarding ramp of the submarine HMS Astute, and entered the submarine's weapons locker: Donovan took an SA80 rifle and opened fire on CPOs David McCoy and Chris Brown after they confronted him. Donovan then forced his way into the control room, where he shot dead Lieutenant Commander Ian Molyneux and wounded Lt Cdr Christopher Hodge before being tackled to the deck by a visiting dignitary, city council leader Royston Smith, as he reloaded. Donovan pleaded guilty to Molyneux's murder and the attempted murders of Hodge, Brown, and McCoy, and was sentenced to life imprisonment with a minimum of 25 years.

=== Russo-Ukrainian War ===
- January 27, 2022: A Ukrainian conscript soldier named Artemiy Yuryovich Riabchuk, who was serving in Ukraine's National Guard, opened fire in a machine factory, killing five fellow soldiers and wounding five others, before fleeing the scene: he was later arrested by police. On 23 April 2024, Ryabchuk was found guilty and sentenced to life in prison.
- March 2022: According to an unverified Facebook post by a Ukrainian journalist published on March 23, after suffering heavy losses (in excess of close to half of their brigade) a group of Russian conscripts of the 37th Motor Rifle Brigade reportedly attacked their commanding officer, Colonel Yuri Medvedev, running him over with a tank, crushing both his legs approximately 48 kilometres (30 mi) from Kyiv, during the battle of Makariv. An unnamed senior Western official said Medvedev later died of his injuries. The date of the incident is unknown but reports of the hospitalization of Medvedev appeared on March 11.
- June 30, 2026: A Chiliean volunteer in the Ukrainian Army, Rodrigo Sebastián Toro Carvajal, shot dead two Colombian volunteers with an M4 carbine whilst sitting in the back seat of an Opel Vectra while they were driving down Heroes of Ukraine Avenue in Mykolaiv. Carvajal was charged under Article 115 of the Criminal Code of Ukraine for the shootings.

== See also ==
- Fratricide
- List of friendly fire incidents
- Mutiny
- Naval Air Station Pensacola shooting
