= 2023 Japan military facility shooting =

2023 shooting in Gifu, Japan

- Location: 35°25′33″N 136°48′18″E; Gifu, Gifu Prefecture, Japan
- Date: 14 June 2023; 3 years ago Around 9 a.m. (JST, UTC+09:00)
- Target: Military personnel
- Attack type: Shooting, double-murder
- Weapon: Howa Type 89 assault rifle
- Deaths: 2
- Injuries: 1
- Motive: Fragging
- Accused: Naoto Watanabe

On the morning of 14 June 2023, a shooting occurred at a military training center of Japan Ground Self-Defense Force in Gifu, Gifu Prefecture, central Japan. A cadet allegedly opened fire on his colleagues during a live-fire training exercise, resulting in the deaths of two people and the injury of a third. The 18-year-old suspect Naoto Watanabe (渡辺直杜) was arrested.

== Attacks ==
The incident took place at the Hino Basic Shooting Range, located about 7 km east of JR Tokai Gifu Station, which was established in 1907 as a firing range for the 68th Infantry Regiment of the Imperial Japanese Army and has been used by the Japan Ground Self-Defense Force since 1960. Originally an open-air firing range, the area was converted to an indoor firing range in 2015 due to the development of residential areas in the vicinity.

On the day of the incident, live-fire training for the education of new cadets was being conducted from around 9:00 a.m., and this was the last day of firing training. Naoto Watanabe (then 18 years old), one of the self-defense cadets, was working with other cadets at a place called the "preparation line" located in front of the firing position, receiving live ammunition and putting it into the magazine under the instructor's instruction, when he suddenly loaded his gun without permission. Sergeant Kosuke Yashiro (then 25 years old), who was in charge of the waiting area, noticed this and instructed Watanabe to stop moving. At around 9:08, Watanabe fired at Sgt. Kosuke Yashiro with a Type 89 5.56mm rifle, and then turned toward Master Sgt. Yasuchika Kikumatsu (he was 52 years old), who was in charge of the "ammunitions staff" that managed and delivered live ammunition in the back. He then turned around and fired at Yasuchika Kikumatsu, who was in charge of managing and receiving live ammunition behind him, and fired at Yusuke Hara. Kosuke Yashiro was hit in the side, Yasuchika Kikumatsu was hit twice in the chest, and Yusuke Hara was hit in the left thigh. Sergeant Yusuke Hara was seriously injured with a total recovery of three months. Sergeants Kosuke Yashiro and Yasuchika Kikumatsu who died and Sergeant Yusuke Hara who was seriously injured were all assigned to Moriyama Garrison.

Candidate Watanabe, who fired the gun, was taken into custody on the spot, arrested on suspicion of attempted murder, and handed over to the Gifu Prefectural Police. On 15 July, the prefectural police switched the charge against Watanabe to murder and sent him to the Gifu District Public Prosecutors Office. Since this case occurred inside a Self-Defense Forces facility, it is now a joint investigation by the prefectural police and the MP force. On July 20, the Gifu District Public Prosecutors Office began to detain Watanabe for evaluation in order to examine his mental condition at the time of the incident. On November 22, the Gifu District Public Prosecutors Office announced that it had applied to the Gifu Summary Court for an extension of the expert testimony detention, which was granted. On January 18, the Gifu District Public Prosecutors Office announced that the expert opinion detention had been terminated. On January 23, the Gifu District Public Prosecutors Office referred Watanabe to the Gifu Family Court on charges of robbery-homicide and attempted robbery-homicide; on February 19, the Gifu Family Court (Judge Saori Hamaguchi) noted that "this is a brutal crime with no regard to the seriousness of human life and the social impact is serious," and decided to remit Watanabe back to the court as the criminal punishment was appropriate.

== Suspect ==
The suspect, Naoto Watanabe (Japanese: 渡辺直杜), a JSDF cadet, had enlisted in the JGSDF 35th Infantry Regiment stationed at Moriyama Garrison in April of the same year. The suspect stated that "a 52-year-old instructor was his target." On September 20, the JGSDF disciplinary dismissed Naoto Watanabe from his position.

== Impact ==
=== Within Japan ===
- Defense Minister Yasukazu Hamada apologized for the concern he had caused the public and expressed his condolences to the victims.
- Chief of the Ground Staff Yasuomi Morishita held a press conference to apologize and announced that an investigation committee had been set up to determine the cause of the incident and prevent its recurrence.
- Shigeki Sato, chairman of the Diet task force committee of the New Komeito Party, said that he hoped the ruling party would make efforts to clarify the cause, take measures to prevent recurrence, and restore trust at the meeting.
- Former Assistant General Hiroshi Suzuki said that while he was sorry for the incident, it reminded him of the 1984 JSDF recruit mass shooting of a trained Self-Defense Force soldier shooting small arms.

=== International ===
- Foreign media, including the BBC in the United Kingdom, also reported the incident.

== Aftermath ==
- The Japan Ground Self-Defense Force suspended firing drills throughout the country.
- Sergeant Kosuke Yashiro was specially promoted to the rank of 2nd Sergeant and Sergeant Yasuchika Kikumatsu was specially promoted to the rank of Chief.

== See also ==
- 1984 JSDF Yamaguchi training ground shooting incident
- Kawase Ekimae police shooting incident
- Higashifuji Training Area Illegal Shooting Incident
- Duty to take safety precautions in JSDF
- List of massacres in Japan
