= Harold J. Greene =

United States Army general (1959–2014)

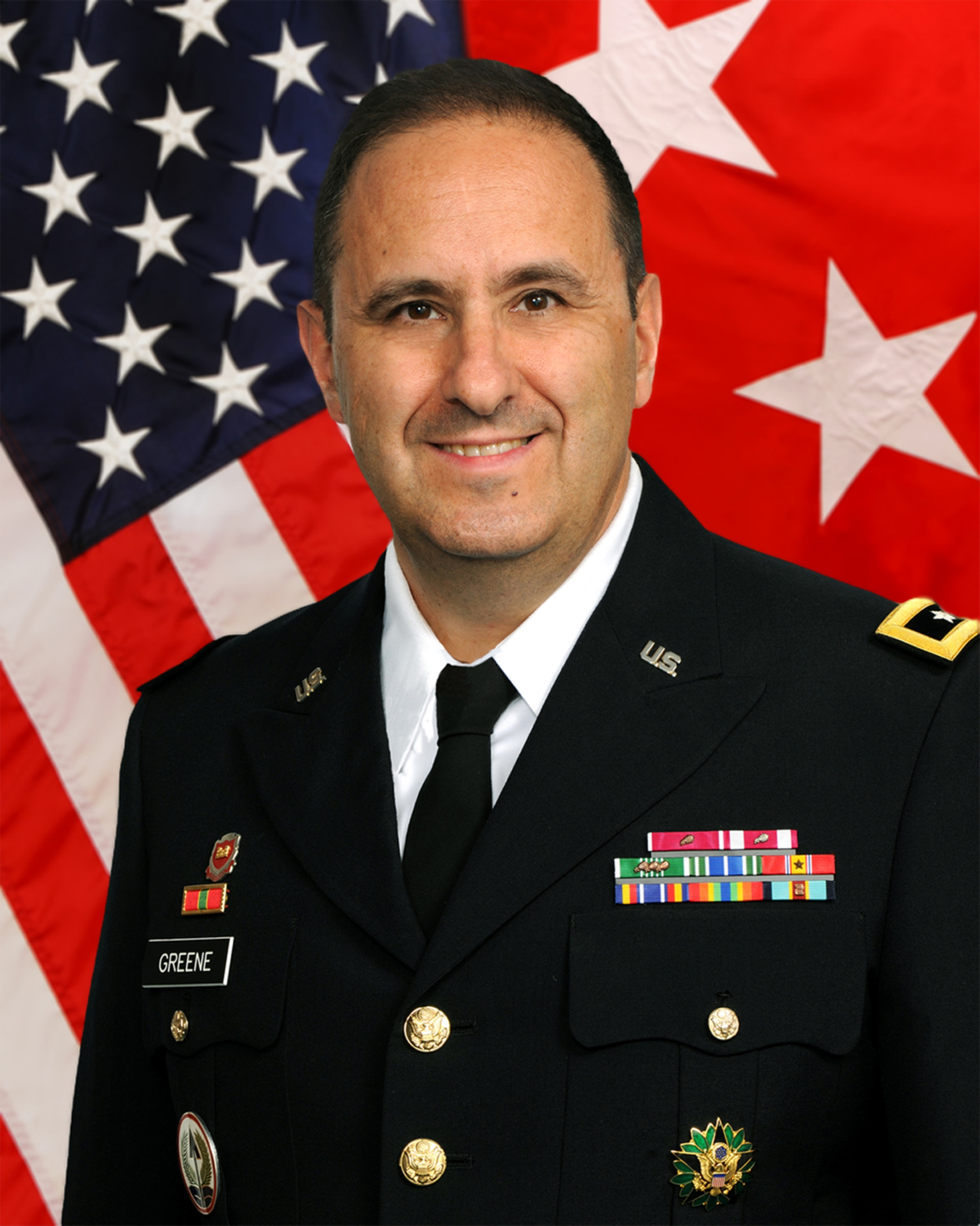
- Greene in 2012
- Born: February 11, 1959; Boston, Massachusetts, United States
- Died: August 5, 2014 (aged 55); Camp Qargha, Kabul, Afghanistan
- Burial place: Arlington National Cemetery
- Spouse: Sue Myers (wife)
- Children: 2
- Military career
- Allegiance: United States
- Branch: United States Army
- Service years: 1980–2014
- Rank: Major General
- Nickname: "Harry"
- Commands: Natick Soldier Systems Center
- Conflicts: War in Afghanistan †
- Awards: Army Distinguished Service Medal; Legion of Merit (4); Purple Heart (Note: Posthumously awarded.)

Harold Joseph "Harry" Greene (February 11, 1959 – August 5, 2014) was an American military officer. During his time with the United States Army, he held various commands associated with engineering and logistical support for American and coalition troops in Afghanistan. At the time of his death, he was the deputy commanding general of the Combined Security Transition Command.

In August 2014, at the rank of major general, Greene became the highest-ranking American service member to have been killed by hostile action since Lieutenant General Timothy Maude was killed in the September 11 attacks in 2001, and also the highest-ranking service member to have been killed on foreign soil during a conflict since Rear Admiral Rembrandt C. Robinson was killed during the Vietnam War in May 1972. To date, Greene is the highest-ranking American fatality of the ongoing global war on terrorism.

While at Camp Qargha in Kabul, Greene and a delegation of general officers and other dignitaries were conducting an inspection tour when 22-year-old Private Rafiqullah of the Afghan National Army (ANA) opened fire on the group, killing Greene and wounding 14 NATO and ANA personnel. The assailant was then shot dead by two NATO service members. A subsequent investigation indicated that Rafiqullah had carried out the fragging due to his irritation and unhappiness over being denied leave to travel home during Eid al-Fitr.

Greene's body was flown back to the United States, arriving at Dover Air Force Base in Delaware on August 7, 2014. A week later, he was buried at Arlington National Cemetery in Virginia.

== Early life and education ==
Greene was born in Boston, Massachusetts, on February 11, 1959, to Eva May Shediak (May 22, 1928 – February 15, 2013) and Harold F. Greene (born 1930 - October 31, 2023). He grew up in Schenectady, New York graduated from Guilderland High School in 1977, and from Rensselaer Polytechnic Institute (RPI) with a bachelor's degree in materials engineering in 1980. Greene's father lived in Guilderland, New York at the time of his death. His mother died in February 2013. Greene received a master's degree in industrial engineering from RPI, and a master's in materials engineering from the University of Southern California (USC). In addition, he received a master's degree in mechanical engineering from USC, and a Doctor of Philosophy (1992) in materials science, also from USC.

Greene's military education included the Engineer Officer Basic and Advanced Courses, and the United States Army Command and General Staff College. He completed the Defense Systems Management College's Advanced Program Management Course at the Defense Acquisition University, and also held a Master of Strategic Studies degree from the United States Army War College.

== Career ==
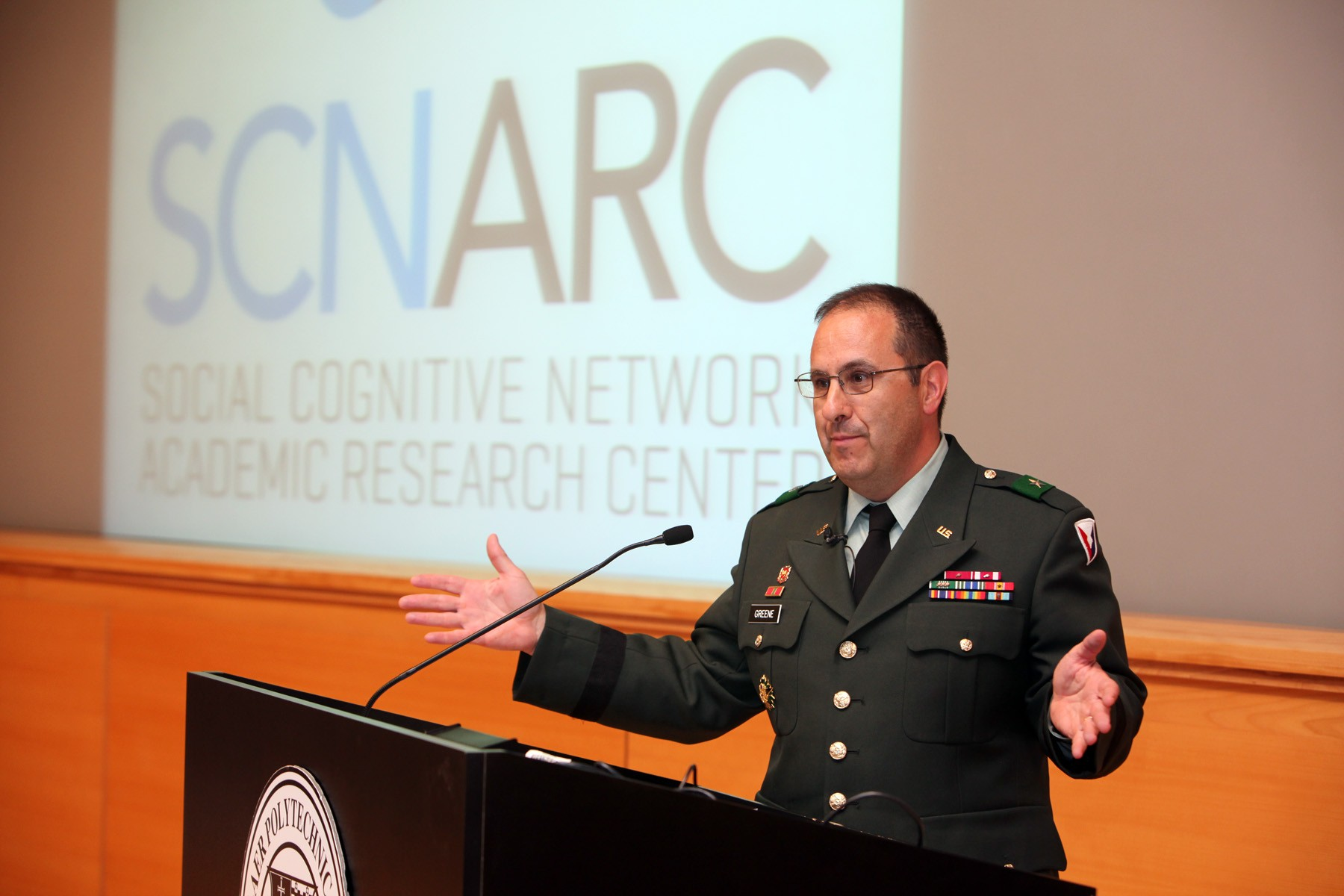
Greene speaking at the Rensselaer Polytechnic Institute in May 2010

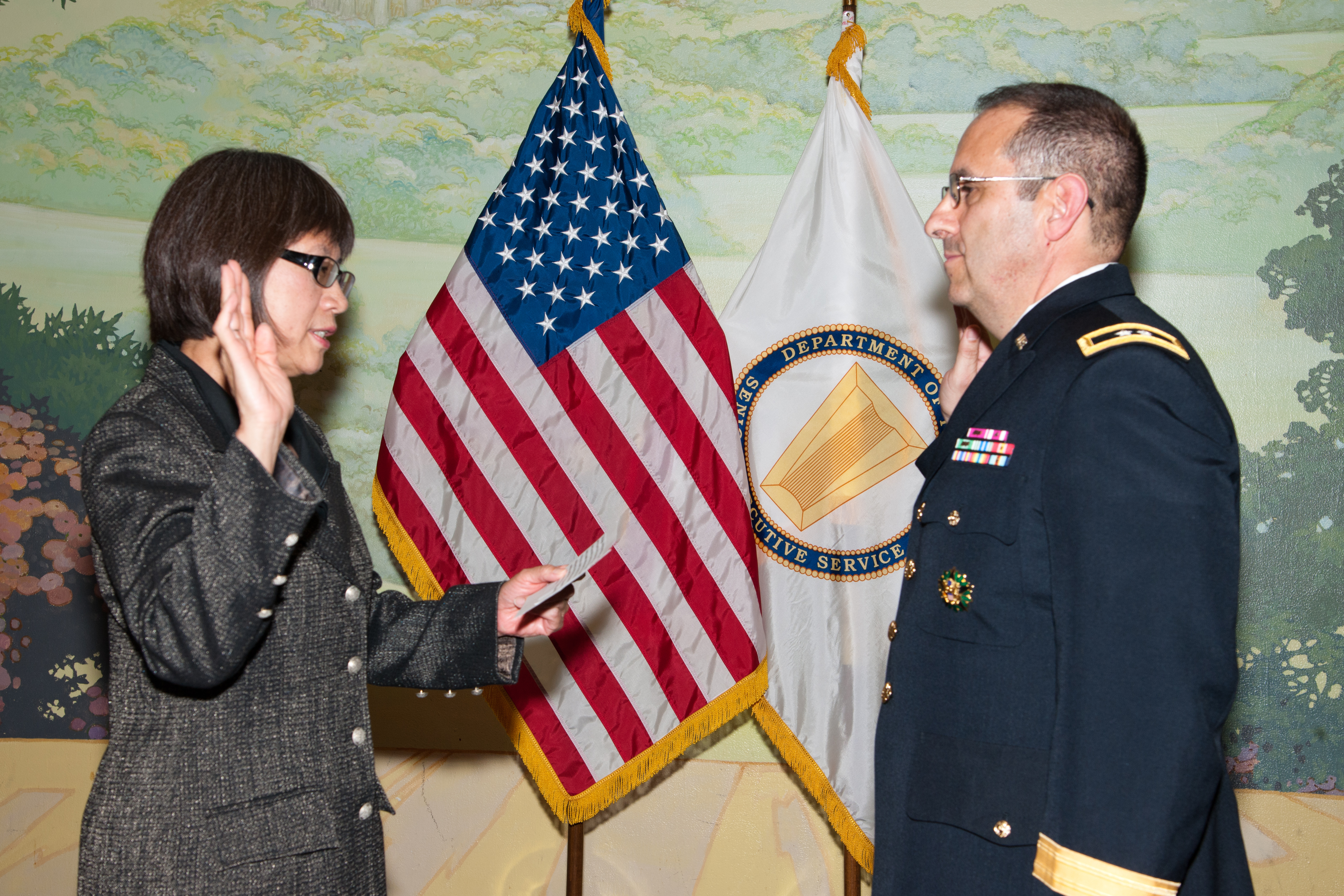
Greene being promoted to major general in August 2012 by Heidi Shyu, United States Assistant Secretary of the Army for Acquisition, Logistics, and Technology

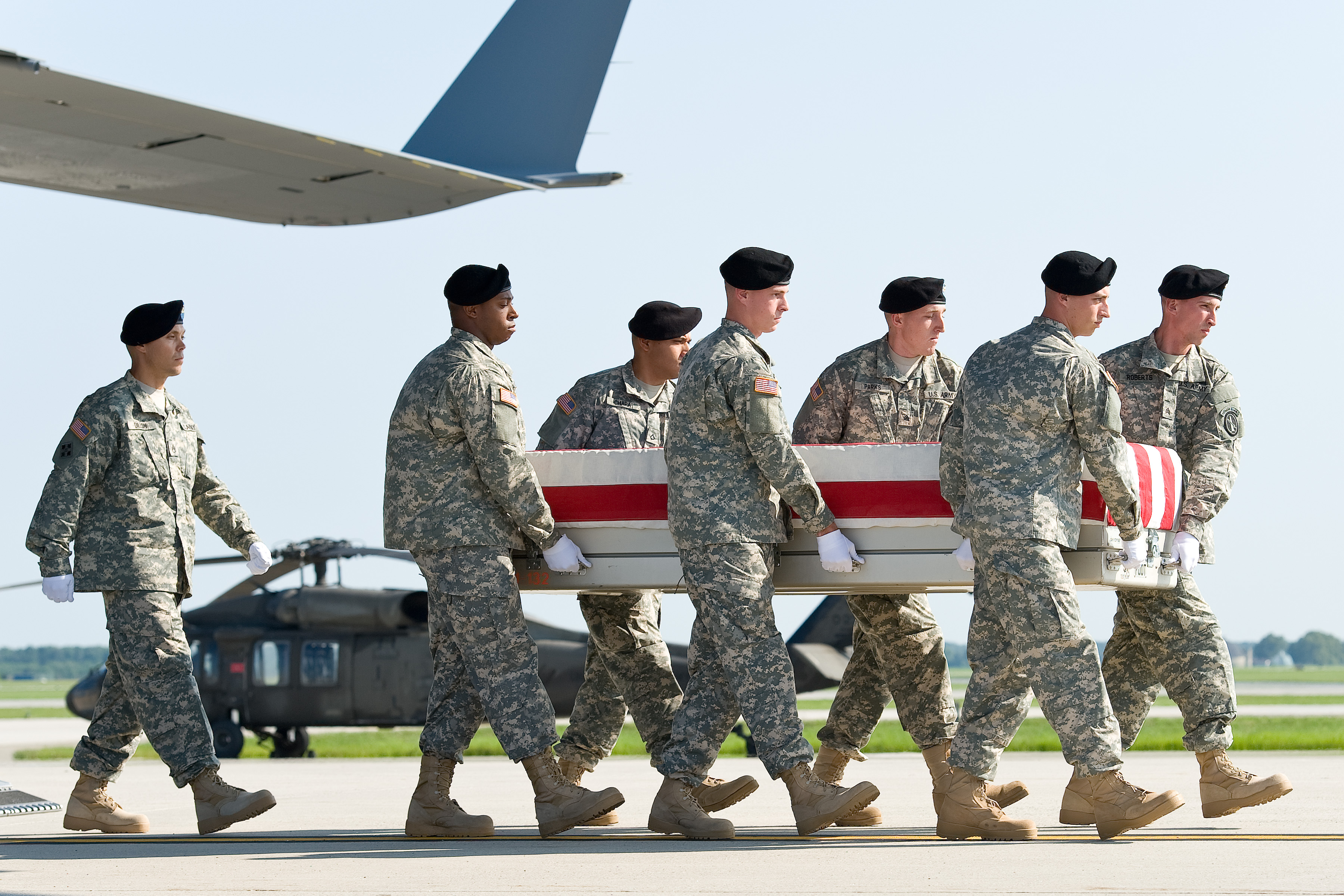
U.S. Army soldiers remove Greene's casket from a plane after it arrives in Delaware.

Greene received his commission as an engineer officer in 1980, after completing Reserve Officer Training Corps at RPI.

As he worked his way through the ranks, Greene's assignments included platoon leader, company executive officer, and battalion staff officer, Fort Polk; resident engineer in Athens; project engineer in Istanbul; brigade engineer and company commander, V Corps, West Germany; staff officer and materials engineer, Army Aviation and Troop Command, St. Louis; product manager, Aerial Common Sensor, Fort Monmouth; and assistant director, Combat Developments Directorate, U.S. Army Maneuver Support Center, Fort Leonard Wood. At the time of the September 11 attacks in 2001, he was stationed at Fort Leonard Wood.

Greene was promoted to brigadier general in late 2009, and served as deputy commanding general of United States Army Research, Development and Engineering Command at Aberdeen Proving Ground. and the commanding general of Natick Soldier Systems Center. While at Natick, Greene urged the military to incorporate smartphones, video games and virtual worlds into military training. Later, he became Program Executive Officer for Intelligence, Electronic Warfare and Sensors in the Office of the Assistant Secretary of the Army (Acquisition, Logistics and Technology). Promoted to major general in 2012, he was Deputy for Acquisition and Systems Management in the same office. In January 2014 he was named deputy commander of Combined Security Transition Command – Afghanistan during Operation Enduring Freedom – Afghanistan.

== Death ==
On August 5, 2014, Greene died in a fragging incident after being shot by an Afghan soldier with an M16 rifle at Camp Qargha's Marshal Fahim National Defense University in Kabul, Afghanistan. He had been making a routine visit to a training facility at the time. The Afghan National Army MP, identified as Rafiqullah, began firing from his barracks room window on Greene and about 90 other U.S. and coalition forces who were visiting the university. Fourteen NATO and Afghan service members were wounded in the attack, including Brigadier General Michael Bartscher of the German Bundeswehr, two Afghan generals and another Afghan officer, eight Americans, and two British soldiers. The Afghan soldier was shot and killed by two NATO service members identified as one Danish and one American.

On the morning of August 7, 2014, Greene's body arrived at Dover Air Force Base in Delaware. Greene was buried in Arlington National Cemetery on August 14, 2014.

On July 10, 2015, the Town of Natick, Massachusetts renamed Kansas Street in Greene's honor. On September 25, 2015, the nine British servicemen acting as the Close Protection Team for the group were awarded the US Army Commendation Medal for their heroism in saving the lives of many others.

== Personal life ==
Greene was married to Sue Myers, a doctor and retired colonel who worked as a professor at the U.S. Army War College in Carlisle, Pennsylvania. At the time of his death, she lived in Falls Church, Virginia. Greene had two children, a daughter, Amelia Greene, and a son, Matthew Greene, who is a retired U.S. Army Major.

== Awards and decorations ==

1st row	Army Distinguished Service Medal		
2nd row	Legion of Merit with three oak leaf clusters	Purple Heart Medal	Meritorious Service Medal with one silver oak leaf cluster
3rd row	Army Commendation Medal with three oak leaf clusters	Army Achievement Medal	National Defense Service Medal with one bronze service star
4th row	Global War on Terrorism Service Medal	Army Service Ribbon	Army Overseas Service Ribbon with award numeral 2

== See also ==
- United States military casualties in the War in Afghanistan
- Major General Nathanael Greene
