= List of mass shootings in Russia and the Soviet Union =

List of mass shootings in Russia and the Soviet Union may refer to:

- List of mass shootings in Russia
- List of mass shootings in the Soviet Union
