= Court-martial of Billy Dean Smith =

U.S. Army Private court-martialed for fragging

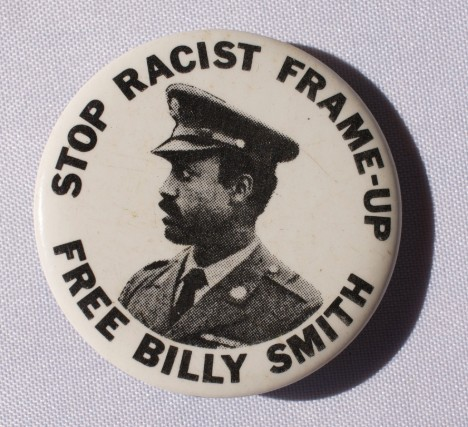
Free Billy Dean Smith Button

Private Billy Dean Smith was court-martialed by the U.S. Army in 1972 on charges of the premeditated murder of two officers and premeditated attempted murder of two other officers in Vietnam on March 15, 1971. He was charged with throwing a hand grenade into an officers' barracks at the Ben Hoa military base. All of the officers were white and Smith was Black. Smith had been open about his opposition to the war, which he felt was racist, and to the racism he felt he and other non-white GIs were experiencing in the military. Smith, his defense team and his supporters, all argued this was the reason he was quickly held responsible for the explosion, even though they felt there was very little evidence to support the charges. Smith's ultimate exoneration through military court-martial seemed to confirm his supporters arguments. This was the first trial in the U.S. where a defendant was charged with fragging, the deliberate or attempted killing of a soldier, usually a superior officer, by another soldier. The term fragging emerged during the Vietnam War, when the occurrence of these incidents reached unprecedented numbers and were often committed or attempted using a fragmentation or hand grenade. According to author George Lepre, there were 904 documented or suspected fragging incidents in Vietnam between 1969 and 1972 (see here for more detail). Smith was also charged with assaulting a military police (MP) staff sergeant and with kneeing and spitting on another MP during his arrest. His court-martial at Fort Ord in California took over two months while generating national and international press coverage. On November 14, 1972, Smith was found not guilty of all six counts of murder, attempted murder and assault. He was found guilty on the most minor charge of resisting arrest, but even this was subsequently overturned on appeal. He spent nearly two years in solitary confinement for "23 out of 24 hours of every day" for crimes he was found innocent of committing. Smith's treatment and confinement has been compared to that of First Lieutenant William L. Calley Jr., the white Army officer who had been convicted of murdering innocent Vietnamese villagers at Mỹ Lai, and was allowed to live in private officer quarters, before, and even after, his conviction.

== Background ==
Smith, one of twelve children, was born in Bakersfield, California in 1948. He moved at an early age with his family to Texas for ten years, and then to the Watts area of Los Angeles in 1957. After graduating from Washington High School in 1967 he worked as a machinist, drove a school bus, sold cars and picked up jobs wherever he could until he was drafted into the Army in 1969. At that point, he was already opposed to the war in Vietnam, but respected his family's wishes that he not risk going to jail. He completed basic training and then Advanced Individual Training at Fort Sill in Oklahoma, and was sent to Vietnam in October 1970. In Vietnam, he very quickly felt he was being singled out for harassment for his race and lack of enthusiasm for the war. As he put it, "I had stated time and time again that I realize that the war in Indochina was unjust and racially motivated, and most of all that I strictly hated all who had high regard for the habitual butchery of the Vietnamese people." Within just a few months he had been given three Article 15 non-judicial punishments by his commanding officer for "minor infractions" and was being processed for discharge for "unsuitability and unfitness". According to Smith's commanding officer, he was unenthusiastic about "closing with the enemy". One of Smith's Article 15 punishments was for unsatisfactory shaving, an offence often overlooked in front line combat zones. As an article in The Black Scholar put it, "Six months in Vietnam had gained Billy the reputation of having a 'bad attitude.' Billy Dean was not a 'good nigger.'"

All of this came to a head after the grenade went off on March 15th. Smith's commanding officer, Captain Randall Rigby, arrived at the scene and immediately claimed he and his first sergeant, Billy Willis, "were the intended victims" because they "were to have slept in the barracks that night". More, the Captain and his first sergeant decided the "only logical guilty party was the black GI with the 'bad attitude', Billy Smith." First Sgt. Willis made explicit their reasoning during the court-martial: Smith "was the only man I had problems with and his was the first name that popped into my head". With no concrete evidence, Rigby and Willis called a battalion formation and, within 90 minutes of the explosion, arrested Smith for murder and attempted murder in front of all the potential witnesses.

== Court-martial ==
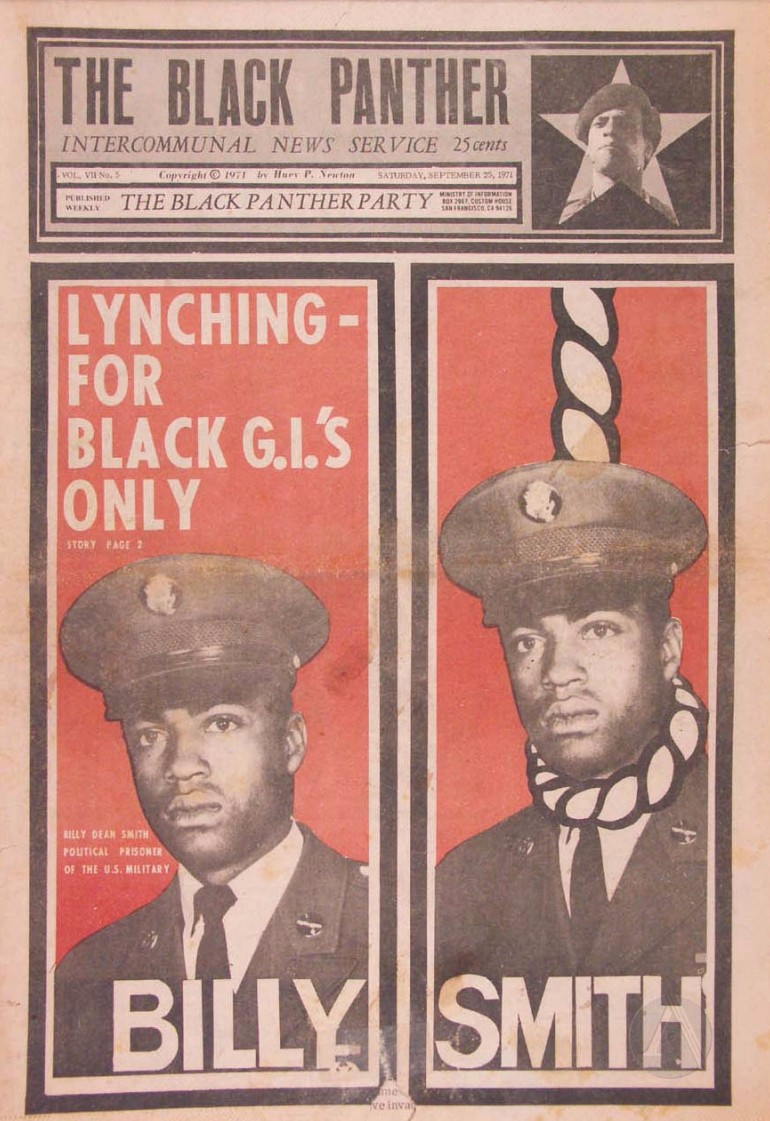
Billy Dean Smith on the Cover of The Black Panther Newspaper September 1971

Smith's court-martial began at Fort Ord in California on September 6, 1972. It drew media attention from around the United States and internationally because it was the first case of fragging ever tried in the U.S., plus the prosecution was arguing for the death penalty. The possibility for the death penalty was only taken off the table by the presiding judge when the trial started. The case had also become widely known after being discussed in Congressional hearings the previous year as a prime example of the phenomenon of fragging in Vietnam. Further, numerous antiwar groups and individuals, including Vietnam Veterans Against the War (VVAW), the United States Servicemen's Fund, the Black Panther Party, Angela Davis and others had been helping to rally support and funds for Smith's defense. Smith was represented pro bono by Luke McKissack, a well known civil rights lawyer, and the actor Burt Lancaster contributed money to his defense.

The military jury was composed of "seven career officers", five white and two Black. The prosecutions case included little direct evidence, relying mainly on circumstantial testimony. Rigby and Willis both testified that Smith was a "disciplinary problem" and they believed he hated them "enough to want to kill them". The defense countered with witnesses who testified that resentment against Rigby and Willis was "widespread among the troops." The defense agreed with the prosecution that Smith was charged "because he had been a disciplinary problem", and they also contended he was singled out because he was Black and openly against the war. The defense also pointed out that it made no sense for Smith to try to kill the very commanding officer who was trying to get him sent home for being a disciplinary problem. Louis Monaco, who was on Smith's defense team, explained the contradiction in a filmed interview: The "commanding officer decided that he must have been the target, because he was planning to send Billy home. Now, to us, that was absolutely absurd. If Billy thought he was being sent home...he would have swam home."

The prosecution claimed to have an eyewitness who had seen Smith running from the scene, but when the witness took the stand he "shocked" the prosecutor by saying, "The man I saw running was not Billy Dean Smith." Other prosecution witnesses admitted on the witness stand they had been "intimidated by their superiors into making false statements" against Smith. The prosecution also said a grenade pin had been found in Smith's possession that matched parts of the exploded grenade found at the scene. They called a crime lab technician who testified he "had linked a grenade pin found on Private Smith with [a] grenade lever found near the scene of the explosion." However, three expert defense witnesses countered this testimony saying it was not possible to be sure there was a match. One of them, "a firearms and tool marks identification expert for the Institute of Forensic Sciences" and former police officer said, "I can take two pins pulled apart at random...and make a better match than is represented here." There was also testimony that soldiers in Vietnam commonly carried spare grenade pins as a safety measure in case they had to disarm live grenades being held with their levers manually depressed. Smith himself testified the pin "was planted on him at the time of his arrest." The last of the prosecution's case seemed to crumble when a soldier in Smith's battalion took the stand and testified, "I was in a bunker smoking dope with Billy Smith when we heard the explosion."

The court-martial jury deliberated for less than six hours and found Smith innocent of all but the most minor charge of resisting arrest (which was later overturned on appeal). "Thirteen members of Smith's family cheered loudly as the verdict was read." After having spent nearly two years in solitary confinement, Smith was immediately released from the Fort Ord stockade on November 14, 1972.

== Aftermath ==
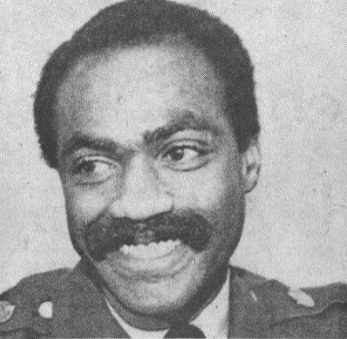
Billy Dean Smith After Acquittal Nov 1972

As mentioned above, even the minor resisting arrest conviction against Smith was overturned on appeal. In 1975, the Army Court of Military Review threw out the conviction arguing that since he knew he was innocent of the charges he had a right to resist arrest. The court ruled that because "the arrest and apprehension" was unlawful, "he was entitled to resist such an arrest with reasonable force."

Smith's exoneration discredited the military at a time when the Vietnam War was becoming more and more unpopular. This was underlined by the fact that the prosecution's own witnesses provided some of the most convincing evidence that Smith was not guilty. One of their witnesses was even revealed to have been undesirably discharged from the military three different times under three different names. Critics called the court-martial a "blatant and groundless persecution of an innocent man."

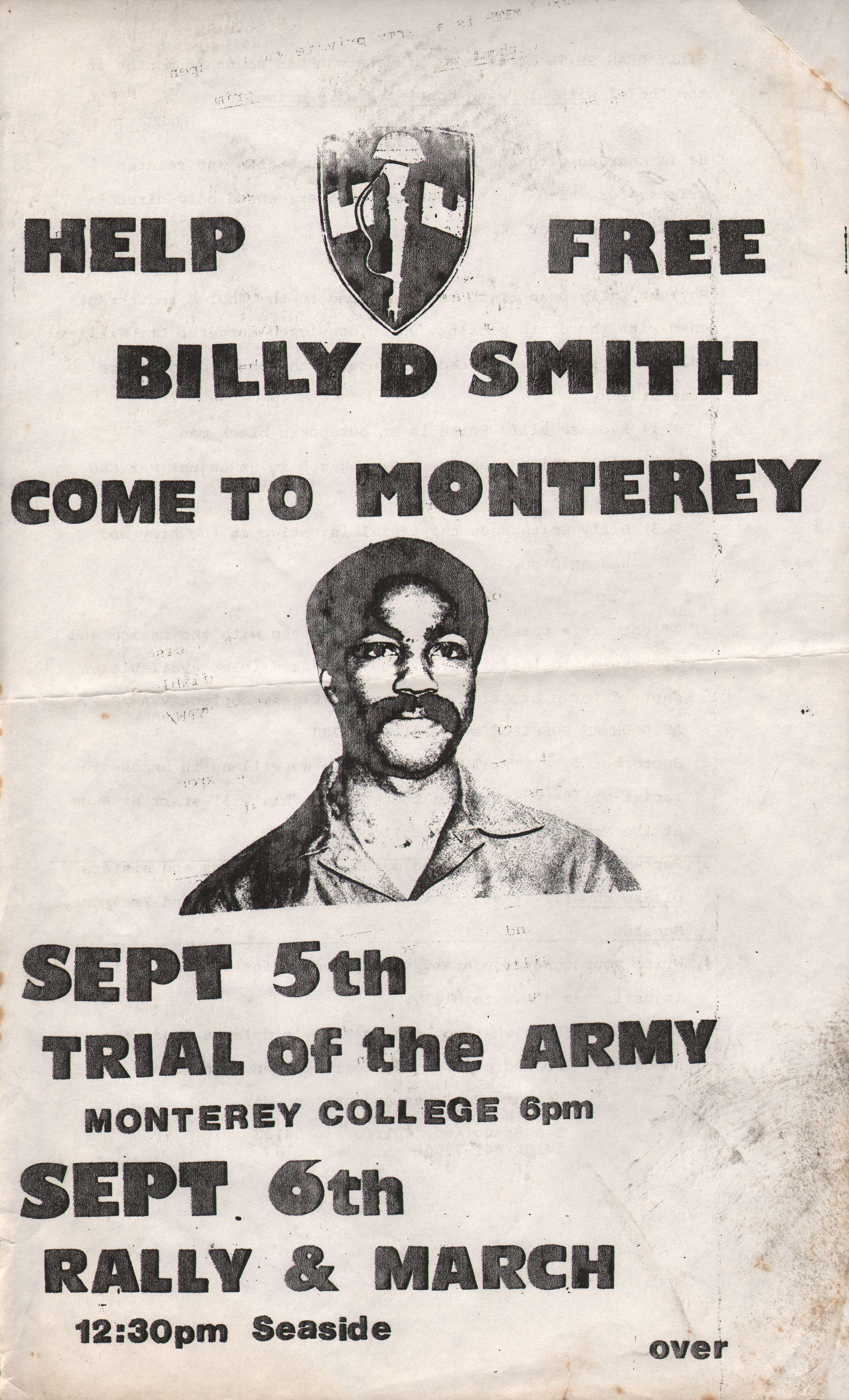
Flyer for Trial of the Army Sept 5, 1972 to Free Billy Dean Smith

Smith read an official press statement on November 15, 1972, which included:

One of the questions which has been asked of me repeatedly since my acquittal yesterday at Fort Ord concerns how I feel about the system of 'military justice'. Most people want to know whether my acquittal means that I got a fair trial or insist that it is proof positive that the system works. May I say that the system of 'military justice' is still riddled with injustice. If I had been tried in Vietnam, or if I had failed to receive tremendous popular support throughout the world, or if I did not have a brilliant attorney like Luke McKissack, I would have been railroaded. Considering that I was not tried by a jury of my peers, but by seven career combat officers, it is clear that the army had no evidence of my guilt. I was simply singled out as a scapegoat for the 600 fraggings which have occurred in the last four years in Vietnam and which reflect the low state of morale among enlisted men who want to stop the war, stop the defenseless slaughter of Vietnamese. I was chosen for trial because I was an outspoken critic of the war, and was not afraid to expose the racism in Vietnam.... I am glad to be free, but I can't really be free until the war in Southeast Asia is over.

McKissack attributed Smith's exoneration to the weakness of the military's case and to the "strong public support" that Smith received. Demonstrations had been held outside Fort Ord, as well as in other cities in the U.S. and overseas by GIs, veterans and antiwar groups. VVAW declared a victory. They had helped spread the word to "Free Billy Dean Smith" and held a "Trial of the Army" near Fort Ord, which found the army "guilty".

== See also ==
- Court-martial of Howard Levy
- Court-martial of Susan Schnall
- Presidio mutiny
- Sir! No Sir!, a documentary about the anti-war movement within the ranks of the United States Armed Forces
