= Michael Bartscher =

German Army officer

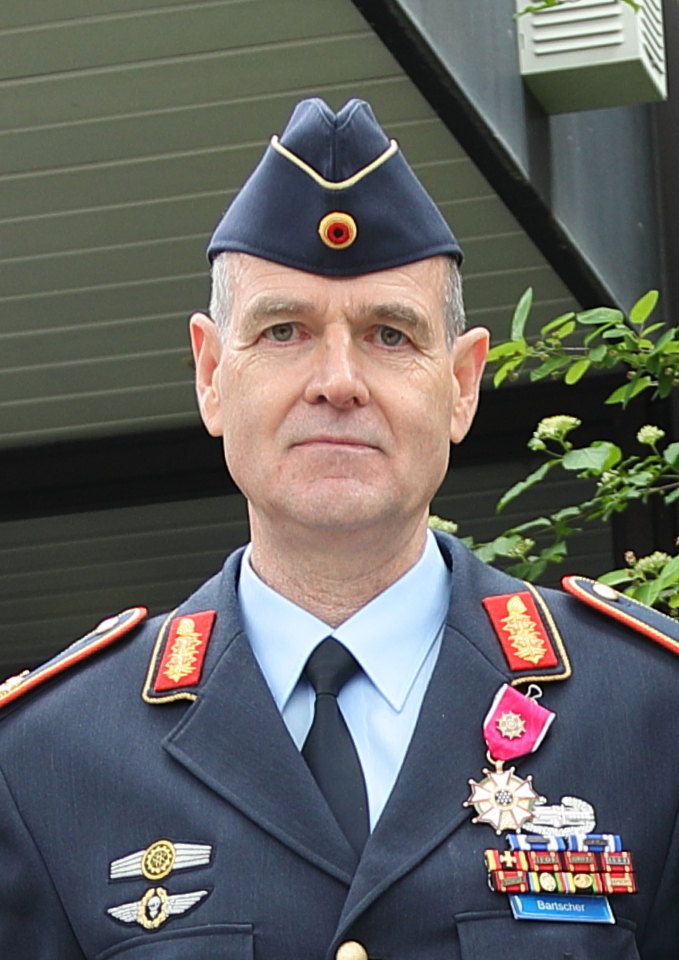
- Brigadier General Michael Bartscher (2018)
- Born: 1958 (age 67–68)
- Military career
- Allegiance: Germany
- Branch: German Air Force
- Service years: 1976–2017
- Rank: Brigadier General
- Commands: Logistics Regiment 46
- Conflicts: War in Afghanistan

Brigadier General Michael Bartscher (born 1958) is a German Air Force officer who has served in logistics roles.

== Biography ==
Bartscher received a Diplom in business administration from the University of the Bundeswehr Munich. Following that, he held various technical and management positions in the logistics units of the German Army. From 1992 to 1994, he took the General Staff Course at the Führungsakademie der Bundeswehr in Hamburg.

Up to the unit's amalgamation in 2012, he served as the commander of Logistics Regiment 46 based in the Freiherr-vom-Stein-Kaserne in Diez, with the rank of Colonel. In June 2012, Bartscher visited soldiers of his regiment at Mazar-e-Sharif in Afghanistan, while it was part of the German contingent of ISAF. Starting in 2012, Bartscher was head of planning, organization, and control in Planning Department II of the Federal Ministry of Defence. In addition, he served as a lecturer on administration at the Führungsakademie. He then took up responsibility for logistics of Bundeswehr deployments at the Bundeswehr Operational Command (Einsatzführungskommando der Bundeswehr) in Geltow.

In 2014, he was appointed to be head of logistics for ISAF's Regional Command North at Camp Marmal. He additionally served as an ISAF military adviser to the Afghan National Army. On 5 August 2014, Bartscher was badly wounded in an attack at Marshal Fahim National Defense University by an Afghan soldier—in which U.S. Army general Harold J. Greene was killed.
