= Gorny shooting =

2019 shooting in Gorny, Russia

- Gorny (Russia)
- Location: 51°33′N 113°02′E; Gorny, Zabaykalsky Krai, Russia
- Date: 25 October 2019; 7 years ago
- Attack type: Mass shooting
- Weapon: AK-74
- Deaths: 8
- Injuries: 2 (both seriously)
- Perpetrator: Ramil Shamsutdinov
- Motive: Response to hazing

On 25 October 2019, a Russian soldier shot ten of his colleagues, killing eight of them, in Gorny, Zabaykalsky Krai, Russia. The gunman was later identified as 20-year-old Ramil Shamsutdinov.

== Shooting ==
The shooting occurred at a military base 150 kilometres (93 mi) north of the border with Mongolia. Two of the eight killed were officers and the rest were enlisted men. The shooting took place at 18:20 (UTC+09:00), right after Pvt. Ramil Shamsutdinov had received an AK-74 assault rifle. Shamsutdinov fired 26 rounds of the 30 in the magazine. A Spetsnaz response-team arrived two minutes after the shooting. Shamsutdinov immediately surrendered without any resistance.

== Investigation ==
The sole suspect was Pvt. Ramil Salengalovich Shamsutdinov (born 1999), a resident of the Vagay village, Tyumen Oblast, and son of a retired military commander. The Chita military court arrested Ramil Shamsutdinov.

=== Motive ===
The Russian Ministry of Defence attributed the events to Shamsutdinov suffering a nervous breakdown. However, Shamsutdinov's father alleges that severe, ritualized abuse of new recruits at the hands of officers and older soldiers drove his son to carry out the shooting, saying that his son had told him "I’m sorry father, I couldn’t have done otherwise. Either they’d kill me or I’d kill them," and that Ramil did not regret his “deliberate” actions. Shamsutdinov testified that he faced physical abuse and threats of rape.

=== Sentencing ===
In January 2021, Shamsutdinov was sentenced to 24½ years in prison. At the time of his sentencing, the Defence ministry had accepted that he was subjected to hazing prior to the shooting. Some victims' families criticized the sentence, arguing that it is too short.

== See also ==
- List of mass shootings in Russia and Soviet Union
- Dedovshchina
