= Forces of Special Purpose =

Military formation during the Russian Civil War

- Части особого назначения
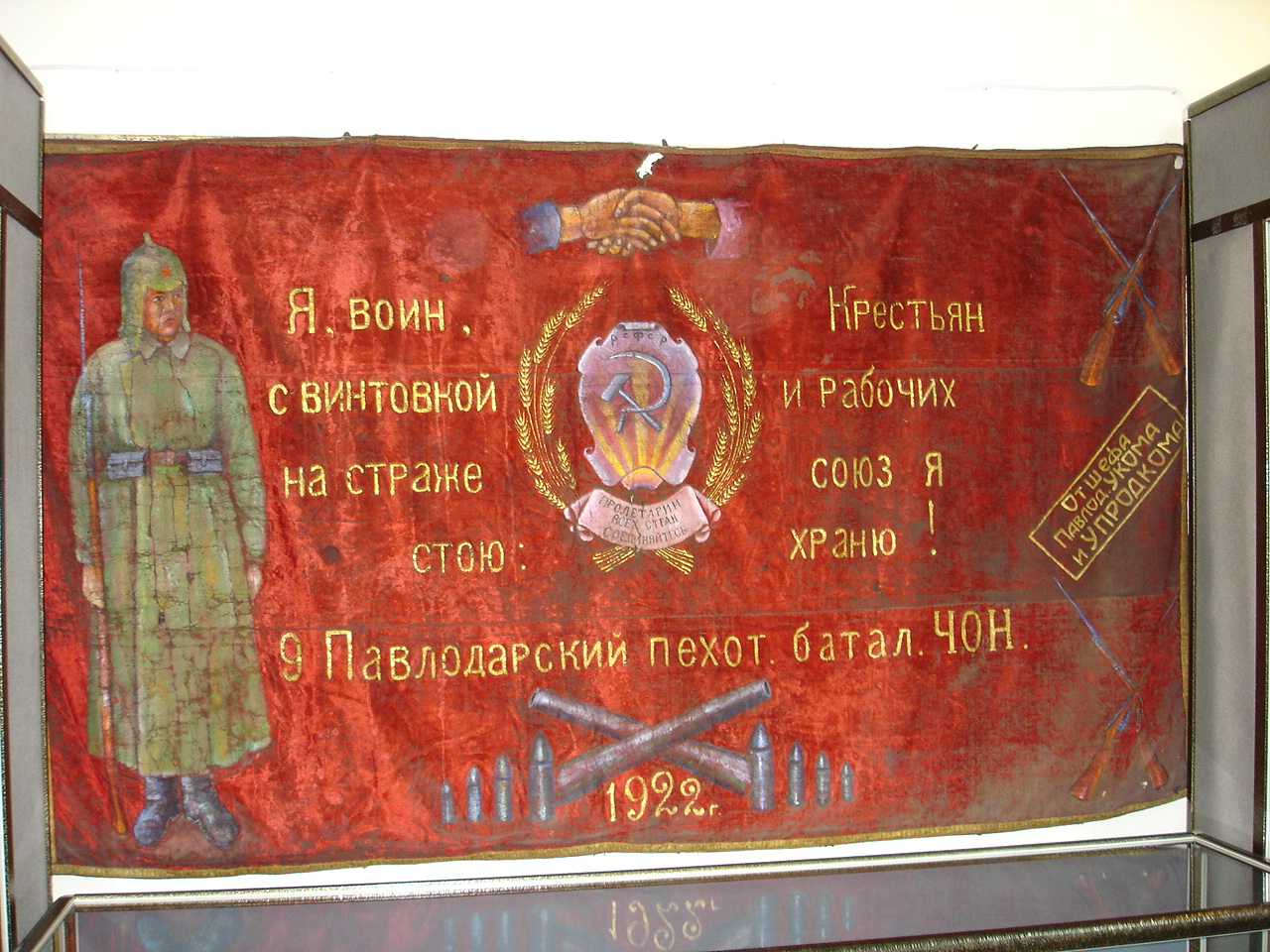
- Other name: ChON
- Dates active: 17 April 1919–1924
- Merged into: Internal troops of the Soviet Union; VOKhR; NKVD
- Allegiance: Third International
- Headquarters: CPSU
- Ideology: Bolshevism

The Forces of Special Purpose (Russian: Части особого назначения; ChON) were a military internal security force established by the Bolsheviks during the Russian Civil War.

== History ==
The ChON were created by a 17 April 1919 declaration of the Central Committee of the Russian Communist Party (Bolsheviks). ChON units were attached to regular party committees, from factory cells to provincial committees, and revolutionary committees. They were tasked with assisting local Soviet authorities with internal security tasks. Small, highly motivated units carried out operations beyond the capabilities of the USSR. The first ChON units were formed from party members and candidate members in Moscow and Petrograd. Membership was later given to trade union and Komsomol members. By September, the ChON had grown to be active in 33 governorates. The ChON units typically came under Red Army operational control in areas close to the frontline. The ChON units were disbanded and merged into the Red Army in 1924.
