= Ivan Yakovlev (military officer) =

Soviet army general (1918–2002)

- Иван Яковлев

Commander of the Soviet Internal Troops
- In office 14 May 1968 – 26 December 1986
- Preceded by: Nikolai Pilshchuk
- Succeeded by: Yuri Shatalin

Personal details
- Born: 5 August 1918 Chernolesskaya, Russian Empire
- Died: 13 September 2002 (aged 84) Moscow
- Resting place: Troyekurovskoye Cemetery
- Citizenship: Soviet
- Party: CPSU
- Education: General Staff Military Academy; Malinovsky Military Armored Forces Academy

Military service
- Allegiance: Soviet Union
- Branch/service: Soviet Army; MVD
- Years of service: 1939–1992
- Rank: Army General
- Commands: Internal Troops
- Battles/wars: Winter War; World War II; Battle of Smolensk

Ivan Kirillovich Yakovlev (Russian: Иван Кириллович Яковлев; 5 August 1918 – 13 September 2002) was Soviet military leader, army general (1980) who served as commander-in-chief of the Internal Troops of the Soviet Union from 1968 to 1986.

== Biography ==
He was born in Chernolesskaya to a Cossack family. He graduated from a seven-year school, and in 1939 - from the Terek Agricultural College in Prokhladny, Kabardino-Balkarian Autonomous Okrug. He worked as a zootechnician at the Kommunar Sovkhoz in the Kantemirovsky District of the Voronezh Oblast.

In September 1939, he was conscripted to the Red Army. He graduated from the Kemerovo Mortar and Artillery School in 1940. Immediately after graduation, he was sent as a platoon commander to the 81st Rifle Regiment of the 123rd Separate Rifle Brigade, and as part of it, he was sent to the front. He took part in the Soviet-Finnish War, and was wounded. After recovery, since 1940, he was a mortar platoon commander in the 681st Rifle Regiment of the 133rd Rifle Division in the Siberian Military District (Biysk).

=== Great Patriotic War ===
On the fronts of the Great Patriotic War from 5 July 1941, when the regiment, raised on alert, arrived at the front. He was successively the commander of the mortar platoon of the 681st rifle regiment of the 133rd Rifle Division of the 24th Army on the Western Front and on the Reserve Front, from January 1942 he served as the commander of a mortar company of the 140th separate rifle brigade on the Volkhov Front, from June 1942 he served as deputy commander, and from December 1942 as commander of the mortar battalion and in 1943 as commander of the mortar division in the same rifle brigade.

From 1943 he served as commander of the 259th separate fighter-anti-tank artillery division, from September 1944 he served as commander of the separate self-propelled artillery division of the 136th Rifle Division on the 1st Ukrainian, 1st Belorussian and 2nd Belorussian fronts. He took part in the Smolensk defensive battle of 1941, the Kalinin defensive operation of 1941, the defensive and offensive stages of the Battle of Moscow, the Battle of the Dnieper, the Korsun-Shevchenko operation, the Lvov-Sandomierz Offensive, the East Prussian offensive, the East Pomeranian offensive, and the Berlin operation.

He proved himself to be a brave and talented commander. At the end of 1943, west of Kyiv, he repelled an attack by 50 enemy tanks with the help of his artillery division and two anti-tank rifle platoons, using artillery ambush and trapping the enemy in a fire trap. In the short battle, the enemy lost 17 tanks and abandoned further attacks in this direction. He ended the war in northern Germany, near the city of Stettin. During the war, he was wounded three times: seriously in December 1941, lightly in May 1942 and November 1943. He was awarded six military orders. During the war, he was promoted from lieutenant to major.

=== Military service in the Ground Forces ===
After the victory, he commanded a division for a year, then entered the academy. In 1949, Yakovlev graduated from the Stalin Military Academy of Armored and Mechanized Forces. He was appointed deputy commander, and in 1950 as commander of the 37th Tank Regiment in the Group of Soviet Forces in Germany. From 1952 he served as deputy commander, and from July 1954 to November 1956 he served as commander of the 25th Guards Mechanized Krivoy Rog Red Banner Division (Brailov, Romania). In 1958, he graduated from the Military Academy of the General Staff.

From 1958, he was the head of the department of the Directorate of Military Educational Institutions of the Soviet Ministry of Defense, and from 1960 the head of the department at the main staff of the Ground Forces. From 1963 he served as the head of the Program and Regulations Directorate in the Main Directorate of Combat Training of the Ground Forces and From December 1965 as Deputy Commander of the Moscow Military District for combat training.

=== Chief of Internal Troops ===
On 14 May 1968, with the rank of lieutenant general of tank troops, he was appointed to the post of chief of the Main Directorate of Internal Troops, Internal and Convoy Guard of the Ministry of Public Order of the Soviet Union. Subsequently, after the reorganization of the ministry, from 11 February 1969, the position was called chief of the Main Directorate of Internal Troops of the Ministry of Internal Affairs of the Soviet Union - chief of internal troops. According to the memoirs of I.K. Yakovlev himself, his appointment was given great attention and before the appointment he was personally received by Leonid Brezhnev.

He held this post for eighteen years. During this time, he changed the appearance of the internal troops, turning them from territorial paramilitary formations into mobile powerful modern troops capable of performing the most complex law enforcement tasks. He reorganized the command of the troops, creating regional Directorates of Internal Troops (analogous to military districts in the armed forces, previously the divisions of the Internal Troops were directly subordinate to the chief of the troops). Under Yakovlev, air and naval units appeared in the Internal Troops, and the combat readiness of the troops increased significantly. The former schools of the Ministry of Internal Affairs in Ordzhonikidze, Saratov and Kharkov were repurposed to train the troops. Special motorized police units were created. In 1969, the Charter of Combat Service of the Internal Troops was approved. It should be recognized that thanks to his work, the Internal Troops met the period of numerous interethnic conflicts and the aggravation of the terrorist threat in readiness to repel these new threats. He was awarded the military rank of General of the Army by the decree of the Presidium of the Supreme Soviet of the Soviet Union on 7 May 1980.

He participated in the liquidation of the consequences of the nuclear disaster at the Chernobyl Power Plant. At that time, over 15 thousand servicemen of the Internal Troops were sent to guard the perimeter of the contaminated zone. Yakovlev spent a long time in the area of the accident, deciding on the site the organization of service, everyday life, decontamination treatment of people and equipment.

On 24 December 1986, he was relieved of his post after the Tu-134 hijacking in Ufa International Airport by servicemen of the 521st escort regiment of the Soviet Ministry of Internal Affairs Matsnev and Yagmurzhi and the murder of several people, as well as a number of conflicts on this basis with the new Minister of Internal Affairs of the Soviet Union, Aleksandr Vlasov. He was appointed military inspector-adviser to the Group of General Inspectors of the Soviet Ministry of Defense. Since 1992, he has been retired. In July 1996, he was appointed consultant to the Commander-in-Chief of the Internal Troops of the Ministry of Internal Affairs of Russia, actively working in this post until the end of his life. He also actively worked in the Council of Veterans of the Internal Troops of the Ministry of Internal Affairs of Russia.

He lived in Moscow, died on 13 September 2002, and was buried at the Troyekurovskoye Cemetery.

He was a member of the Communist Party of the Soviet Union since 1942. Deputy of the Supreme Soviet of the RSFSR of the 8th-11th convocations.

== Awards ==
- Order "For Merit to the Fatherland" 4th degree (Russian Federation, 16.11.1998)
- Order of Courage (Russian Federation, 20.07.1996, for the liquidation of the consequences of the accident at the Chernobyl Nuclear Power Plant)
- Two Orders of Lenin
- Order of the October Revolution (1975)
- Three Orders of the Red Banner (23.12.1943, 1.03.1944, 2.07.1945)
- Order of Suvorov 3rd degree (13.03.1945)
- Two Orders of the Patriotic War 1st degree (11.08.1944, 11.03.1985)
- Two Orders of the Red Star (25.12.1942, 1954)
- Order "For Service to the Homeland in the Armed Forces of the USSR" 3rd degree (30.04.1975)
- Medal "For Battle Merit" (1950)
- Medal "For Distinction in Guarding the State Border of the USSR" (1970)
- Medal "For Courage in a Fire" (1972)
- Various awards of the Soviet Union and the Russian Federation
- Order "Silver Star of Friendship of Peoples" (GDR)
- Medal "Brotherhood in Arms" (Polish People's Republic, 12.10.1988)
- Medal "30 years of the Victory in Khalkhin-Gol" (Mongolian People's Republic, 15.08.1969)
- Medal "30th Anniversary of the Revolutionary Armed Forces of Cuba" (Cuba, 24.11.1986)

== Memory ==
- A bust of Yakovlev was unveiled in a ceremonial setting on August 3, 2018, near the building of the Russian National Guard Museum in Moscow.
- A bust of Yakovlev was unveiled on August 5, 2018, at the Novosibirsk Military Institute of the National Guard Troops named after Yakovlev.
- On July 21, 2008, the name of Yakovlev was assigned to the Novosibirsk Military Institute of the Internal Troops of the Ministry of Internal Affairs of Russia.
- A memorial plaque in honor of Yakovlev was installed on the building of the Main Command of the Internal Troops of the Ministry of Internal Affairs of Russia in Moscow in 2008.
- A street in Moscow in the Lefortovo district (2017).
- In honor of the 100th anniversary of his birth, a postal envelope dedicated to Yakovlev was issued.
