= 10th Rifle Division =

10th Rifle Division can refer to:

- 10th Rifle Division (Soviet Union)
- 10th NKVD Rifle Division of the Soviet Union
- 10th Guards Motor Rifle Division of the Soviet Union

== See also ==
- 10th Division (disambiguation)
