= Internal troops of the Soviet Union =

Internal troops of the Ministry of Internal Affairs of the Soviet Union Внутренние войска МВД СССР Vnutrenniye voyska Ministerstva vnutrennikh del
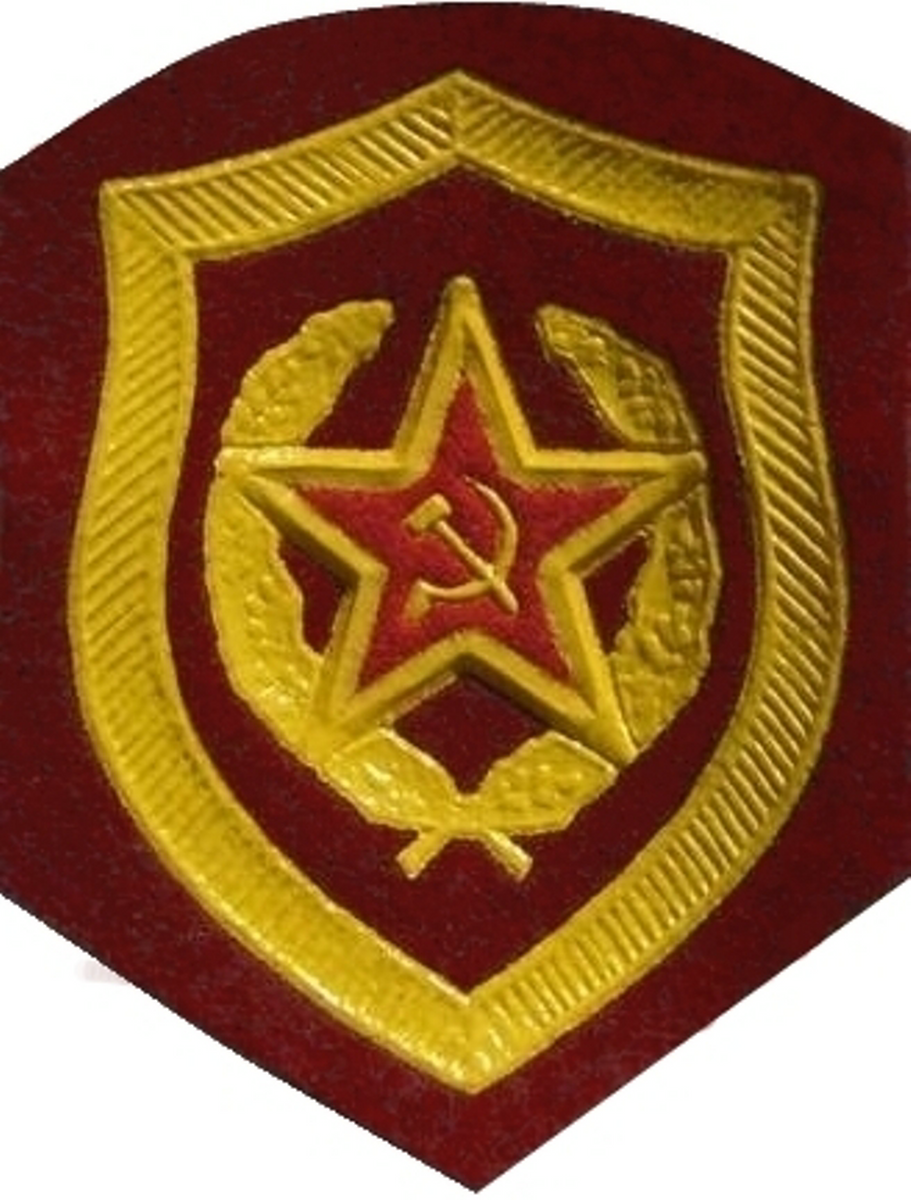

Agency overview
- Formed: 20 October 1923
- Preceding agencies: Special Corps of Gendarmes (1811–1917); VOKhR
- Dissolved: 1991
- Superseding agency: Internal troops of Russia and others
- Employees: 250,000

Jurisdictional structure
- Federal agency: Soviet Union
- Operations jurisdiction: Soviet Union
- Governing body: Ministry of Internal Affairs
- General nature: Federal law enforcement; Gendarmerie; Civilian police

Operational structure
- Headquarters: Moscow

Notables
- Anniversary: March 27

Internal troops of the Ministry of Internal Affairs (Russian: Внутренние войска Министерства внутренних дел СССР, VV MVD) were military formations (analogous to the gendarmerie), which were intended to ensure law and public order and internal security of the Soviet Union, protect state facilities and ensure public safety. Formed in the aftermath of the October Revolution of 1917, the original internal troops, known as the Internal Security Forces of the Republic (VOHR) were created as combat detachments of the All-Russian Extraordinary Commission (Cheka). Numbering approximately 260,000 men in the 1980s, they were one of the largest formations of special troops in the Soviet Union. From September 1, 1939 to March 21, 1989, the internal troops were an integral part of the Soviet Armed Forces but were subordinate to the Ministry of Internal Affairs.

== History ==
Internal troops existed throughout Soviet history, the earliest being the Internal Security Forces under the All-Russian Extraordinary Commission, or Cheka, founded by Lenin's right hand man Felix Dzerzhinsky. The Cheka was conceived as a temporary wartime organ, with the new provisional government dissolving the Okhrana, the Tsarist security police, seeking to create its own internal military force. By the order of the Central Executive Committee, the 'People's Militias' were established following the October Revolution. Armed troops under the People's Militias were entrusted mainly with consolidating the government's power and eliminating opposition. During the Russian Civil War, the internal troops of the Cheka and the Red Army practiced the terror tactics of taking and executing numerous hostages, often in connection with desertions of forcefully mobilized peasants. According to Orlando Figes, more than 1 million people deserted from the Red Army in 1918, around 2 million people deserted in 1919, and almost 4 million deserters escaped from the Red Army in 1921. Around 500,000 deserters were arrested in 1919 and close to 800,000 in 1920 by Cheka troops and special divisions created to combat desertions. Thousands of deserters were killed, and their families were often taken hostage. According to Lenin's instructions:

After the expiration of the seven-day deadline for deserters to turn themselves in, punishment must be increased for these incorrigible traitors to the cause of the people. Families and anyone found to be assisting them in any way whatsoever are to be considered as hostages and treated accordingly.

In September 1918, in just twelve provinces of Russia, 48,735 deserters and 7,325 brigands were arrested: 1,826 were executed and 2,230 were deported. A typical report from a Cheka department stated:

Yaroslavl Province, 23 June 1919. The uprising of deserters in the Petropavlovskaya volost has been put down. The families of the deserters have been taken as hostages. When we started to shoot one person from each family, the Greens began to come out of the woods and surrender. Thirty-four deserters were shot as an example.

Estimates suggest that during the suppression of the Tambov Rebellion of 1920–1921, around 100,000 peasant rebels and their families were imprisoned or deported and perhaps 15,000 executed. This campaign marked the beginning of the Gulag, and some scholars have estimated that 70,000 were imprisoned by September 1921 (this number excludes those in several camps in regions that were in revolt, such as Tambov). Conditions in these camps led to high mortality rates, and "repeated massacres" took place. The Cheka at the Kholmogory camp adopted the practice of drowning bound prisoners in the nearby Dvina river. Occasionally, entire prisons were "emptied" of inmates via mass shootings prior to abandoning a town to White forces. On June 13, 1918, the Cheka Collegium decided to unite all armed detachments in the capital and in the provinces into the Cheka Troops Corps with headquarters in Moscow. On May 28, 1919, by the decree of the Council of Workers' and Peasants' Defense "On auxiliary troops", the Internal Security Troops of the Republic (VOKhR) were created on the basis of the Cheka troops, which included all auxiliary troops that were at the disposal of economic departments - the People's Commissariat of Food, etc. By the same decision, the Headquarters of the Cheka troops was renamed the Headquarters of the VOKhR troops, and in June - the Main Directorate of the VOKhR troops. VOKhR sectors were created according to territorial responsibility: Moscow, Kursk, Petrograd, Eastern, Kiev. A new branch was created to oversee all internal security troops in the USSR, known as the Internal Service Troops. (VNUS). By 1921, the Cheka and its VOHR troops numbered more than 200,000.

On September 1, 1920, the Council of Labor and Defense adopted a resolution on the creation of the Internal Service Troops (VNUS). They included the VOKhR troops, guard troops, railway defense troops, railway police and water police. On September 17, 1920, the Council of Labor and Defense issued a Resolution equating all Cheka employees to the Red Army servicemen. On January 19, 1921, all units and detachments of the Checka were transformed into a special branch of the military — the VChK troops. On February 6, 1922, the All-Russian Central Executive Committee abolished the Cheka and in its place established the State Political Directorate (GPU) under the NKVD of the RSFSR. On March 1, 1922, an order was issued by the Chairman of the GPU on the reorganization of the Checka troops into the GPU troops. On March 27, by the Resolution of the STO, the border guard and escort guard were included in the GPU troops. On November 15, 1923, in connection with the formation of the Soviet Union, a resolution was adopted on the reorganization of the GPU under the NKVD of the RSFSR into the Joint State Political Directorate (OGPU) under the Council of People's Commissars, a little later enshrined in Chapter IX "On the United State Political Administration" of the first 1924 Constitution of the Soviet Union, the basic law of the state. By order of the OGPU, the "Regulation on the Headquarters of the OGPU Troops" was announced. During this period, which began after the Civil War, the young Soviet state was solving problems in the fight against crime and the protection of state borders. In July 1924, the Convoy Guard was transferred from the OGPU to the control of the People's Commissariats of Internal Affairs of the Union Republics (for example, the NKVD of the RSFSR). On August 29, 1924, the Council of Labor and Defense adopted a resolution "On the formation of the escort guard of the USSR and the organization of the Central Directorate of the escort guard in Moscow."

According to the resolution, the escort guard acquired the status of an independent branch of the armed forces. In the territory of Central Asia and Kazakhstan, the escort guard troops (the wording "OGPU troops" was also often encountered) together with the border guard troops and units of the Red Army participated in the fight against the Basmachi movement for a long time On October 30, 1925, the Central Executive Committee and the Council of People's Commissars of the USSR, in accordance with the resolution "On the escort guard of the USSR", created the Central Directorate of the escort guard of the USSR, which reported directly to the Council of People's Commissars. The issues of staffing the escort guard, as well as the logistical supply, were assigned to the bodies of the People's Commissariat for Military and Naval Affairs. The organizational structure of the convoy teams was reduced to that of the Red Army (platoon, company, battalion, regiment). In this order, the troops of the Convoy Guard were reduced to 2 divisions and 6 separate brigades with a total personnel of 14,802 people. On November 6, 1926, by order of the OGPU, the Main Directorate of border guard and OGPU troops of the USSR was created, which carried out direct command of the troops.

=== 1930s ===
On December 1, 1931, it was decided to transfer all departmental paramilitary guards of industrial enterprises to the OGPU. It was assumed that the protection of facilities (depending on their defensive significance) would be carried out by police forces and newly formed OGPU military units, and the paramilitary guard would be liquidated during 1932. On December 4, 1931, the Council of People's Commissars of the Soviet Union assigned the OGPU troops with the protection and defense of railway facilities. The rifle guard units of the People's Commissariat of Communication Routes were reorganized into military units guarding railway structures. Thousands of trained People's Commissariat of Communication Routes of the Soviet Union rifle guard officers continued to serve in the OGPU, including in command positions. For example, Nikolai Vasilyev, a future Soviet military leader, lieutenant general (1944), who served in the NKPS USSR guard from 1923 to 1932, NKVD USSR Colonel N. V. Solodov, and others.

On July 10, 1934, the Central Executive Committee of the USSR decided to create the People's Commissariat of Internal Affairs (NKVD). By the same decree, the OGPU troops were divided into the border and internal guard of the NKVD USSR. With the beginning of the process of dispossession and collectivization, social tensions began to arise throughout the territory of the USSR, ranging from riots and mass unrest to armed resistance to the authorities, which increased the burden on the formations that escorted large numbers of people across the country. In connection with this, in August 1934, the personnel of the escort troops was increased by 20 thousand people. In 1937, the Main Directorate of Border and Internal Security (GUPVO NKVD) was renamed the Main Directorate of Border and Internal Troops of the NKVD of the USSR (GUPVV). On April 20, 1938, the number of NKVD troops, including military units of convoy troops, was established at 28,800 people. On February 2, 1939, 6 separate departments were created within the Main Directorate of Border and Internal Troops within the NKVD of the USSR:

- Main Directorate of Border Troops
- Main Directorate for the Protection of Railway Facilities
- Main Directorate for the Protection of Particularly Important Industrial Enterprises
- Main Directorate of Convoy Troops - jointly manned by the Red Army and the NKVD. The directorate's mission was to convoy the "condemned, military prisoners of war, and persons subject to deportation, and also to provide external security for prisoner-of-war camps, prisons, and some objectives in which the work of 'special contingents' was employed."
- Main Directorate of Military Support
- Main Military Construction Directorate

On September 1, 1939, the law "On General Military Duty" was adopted. For the first time, the law stated that the internal troops are an integral part of the Red Army. On November 20, 1939, by Order of the NKVD, the "Regulations on the escort troops of the NKVD of the USSR" were adopted. It stipulated the tasks of escorting persons in custody and the procedure for external security of individual prisons. The same Regulations set the wartime tasks of the internal troops to escort and protect prisoners of war. In the pre-war years, the internal troops guarded 135 government facilities. They also escorted to 156 judicial institutions and served on 176 railway routes. The number of personnel of the convoy troops on January 1, 1940, reached 34,295 people (one division, 9 brigades, 2 separate regiments and 2 junior command schools). On March 4, 1941, the Directorate of Operational Forces of the NKVD of the USSR was created. In 1941, the Directorate of Convoy Troops of the NKVD was disbanded and merged with the Directorate of Internal Troops of the NKVD. The main tasks for this department: participation in hostilities, guarding reception centers for prisoners of war, guarding trains, and escorting prisoners. In June 1941, the NKVD had two convoy forces security divisions and seven brigades totaling 38,311 personnel to carry out convoy missions. The 13th NKVD Convoy Forces Security Division was in the west of the Ukrainian SSR, the 14th Convoy Forces Security Division was in the Moscow Oblast, plus six separate convoy brigades, including the 41st in the northwest, the 42nd covering the western axis, and the 43rd the southwest.

=== Second World War ===
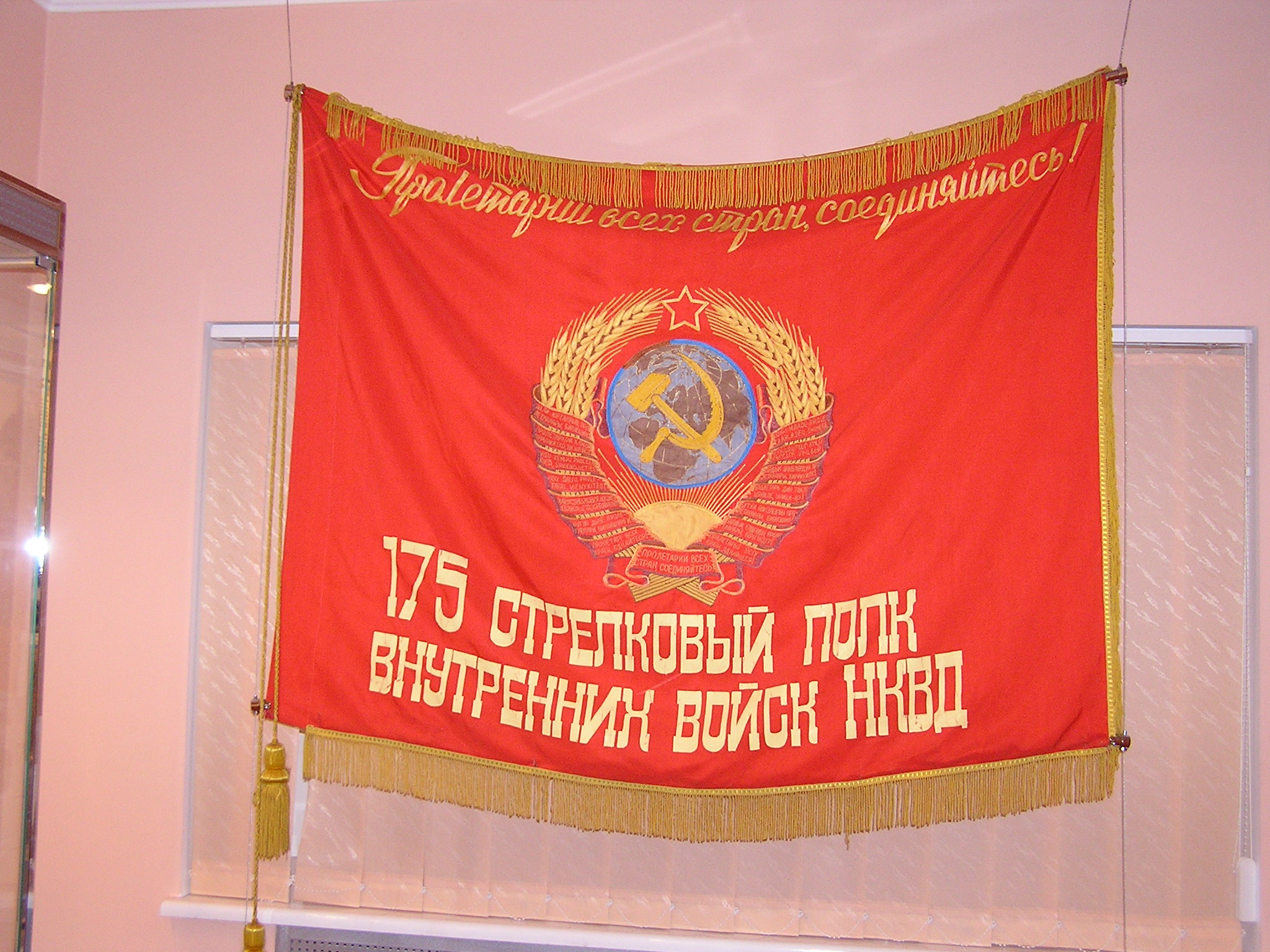
Banner of the 175th Rifle Regiment, Internal Troops, NKVD

In July 1941, formations of the NKVD were providing security for government installations, railway lines, and industrial centres. Railway security forces totalled 62,100, comprising nine divisions and five brigades securing 1,700 sites. Operational forces, the direct forerunners of the internal troops, included 11 regiments stationed in the western military districts, seven regiments and three battalions in the internal districts, and the F. E. Dzerzhinsky Independent Special Designation Division in Moscow (transferred from the OGPU in 1934). In October 1940, a specialised NKVD force had also been formed to assist with local air defence for important areas. By June 1941 this new Main Directorate for Local Antiaircraft Defence had three regiments, including in Moscow, and four battalions, all engineer-anti-chemical units. Another division and five brigades totalling just under 30,000 men were in the process of formation. During World War II, most units of the NKVD internal troops were engaged alongside Red Army forces against Axis troops. On the first day of Operation Barbarossa, the 132nd NKVD Convoy Troops Independent Battalion joined the defence of Brest Fortress, losing its standard in the process. On the basis of units of the internal troops, sabotage units and instructors in military affairs were trained for deployment to partisan detachments in the enemy rear. 1,000 border guards and fighters of the internal troops, including 95 commanders, were allocated to staff the partisan detachments.

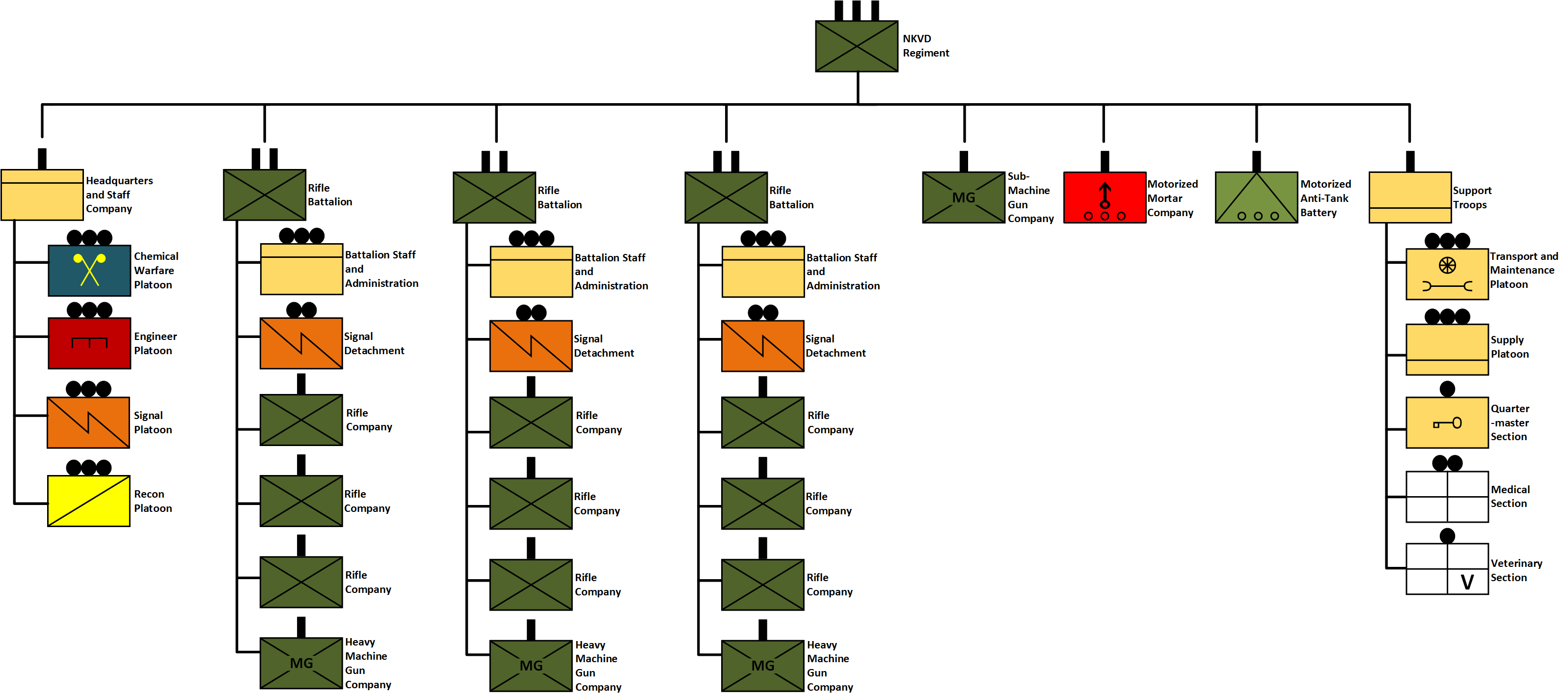
Organizational chart of an internal troops regiment in WWII

In October 1941, the special forces troops of the NKVD of the USSR, which had been formed at the very beginning of the war, were reformed into the Separate Motorized Rifle Brigade for Special Purposes of the NKVD (OMSBON), which in October 1943 became the Separate Special Purpose Detachment of the NKGB of the USSR (OOON). During the frontline battles and operations behind enemy lines during the war, its servicemen were responsible for over 1,400 derailed enemy trains with manpower, equipment, ammunition, fuel, etc., over 300 destroyed railway and highway bridges, about 700 km of disabled cable and telegraph lines, about 350 blown up industrial enterprises and warehouses, about 150 destroyed tanks, armoured vehicles and more than 50 aircraft, over 130,000 destroyed enemy soldiers and officers, including about 90 liquidated prominent representatives of the Nazi occupiers and more than 2,000 fascist agents and accomplices of the enemy. In addition, about 50 guns, mortars and machine guns, more than 850 rifles and machine guns, over 20 tanks, self-propelled guns and tractors, over 100 motorcycles and bicycles were captured as trophies. More than 20 OMSBON/OOON fighters were awarded the title Hero of the Soviet Union.

Raising of new NKVD forces for the front began in the Moscow Military District with an order of June 26:

In accordance with a decision of the USSR's government, the NKVD of the USSR is charged with forming fifteen rifle divisions (10 regular and 5 mountain).

1. Lieutenant General I. I. Maslennikov is entrusted with the task of forming fifteen rifle divisions of NKVD forces.
2. Create an operational group under Lieutenant General Maslennikov consisting of Colonel Miroshichenko, Kombrig I. S. Sheredeg, Kombrig M. N. Shishkarev, and Lieutenant Colonel S. I. Frolov.
3. Begin forming and deploying the [following] divisions immediately: 243rd Rifle Division, 244th Rifle Division, 246th Rifle Division, 247th Rifle Division, 249th Rifle Division, 250th Rifle Division, 251st Rifle Division, 252nd Rifle Division, 254th Rifle Division, 256th Rifle Division, 15th Mountain Rifle Division, 16th Mountain Rifle Division, 17th Mountain Rifle Division, 26th Mountain Rifle Division, 12th Mountain Rifle Division.
4. To form the divisions designated above, assign 1,000 soldiers and non-commissioned officers and 500 command cadre from the NKVD's cadre to each division. Request the Red Army General Staff to provide the remainder of personnel by calling up all categories of soldiers from the reserves.
5. Complete concentrating the NKVD cadre at the formation regions by 17 July 1941...

These divisions, in addition to NKVD border troops, participated in the defense of Moscow, Leningrad, the Brest Fortress, Kiev, Odessa, Voronezh, Stalingrad (10th Internal Troops Rifle Division), the North Caucasus and were heavily engaged during the Battle of Kursk; some fought through to Berlin, although by that time, as regular Red Army divisions, they had little remaining connection to their founding NKVD cadres.

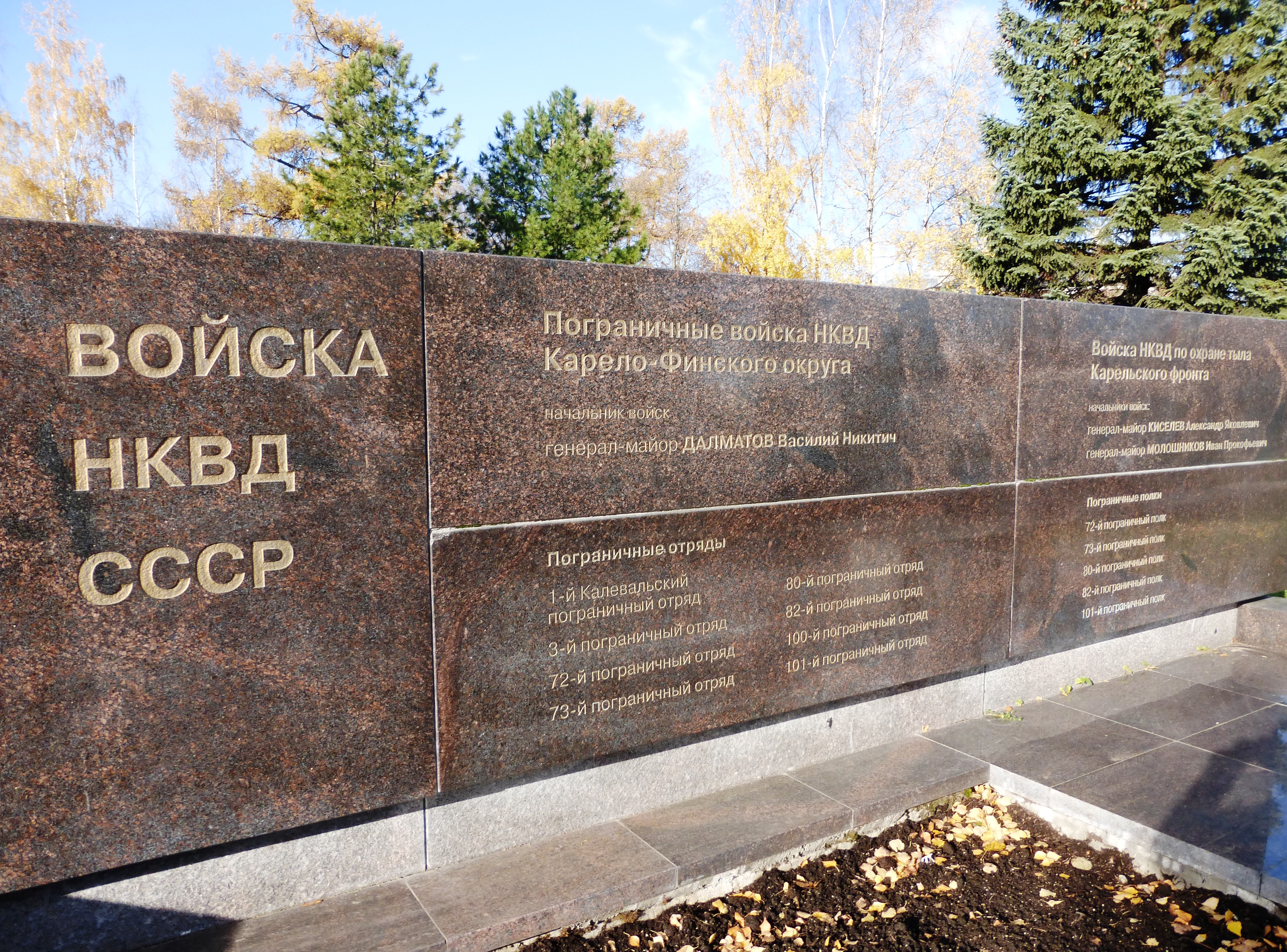
Fragment of the military memorial complex of the Karelian Front in Petrozavodsk

Convoy forces were increased in strength throughout the war. In August 1942 there were four divisions (35th–38th) and five brigades (41st, 43rd, 44th, 45th, 47th; the 42nd and 46th had disappeared). Numbers reached 44,000 in July 1943 and 151,000 in August 1945. Typically, NKVD internal troops were defensive in nature, although they played a particularly instrumental role during the Battle of Moscow, the Siege of Leningrad, and the Battle of Stalingrad where the 10th NKVD Rifle Division suffered almost 90% casualties during the battle. Large internal troops units also stayed in the rear to maintain order, fight enemy infiltrators and to guard key installations (such as the armament manufacturing complex at Tula, protected by the 156th NKVD regiment in 1941) and the railway installations guarded by the 14th Railway Facilities Protection Division NKVD. Altogether, more than 53 internal troops divisions and 20 internal troops brigades were on active duty during the war, among them the 10th, 1st and the 4th NKVD Rifle Divisions. Of those, 18 units were awarded battle honors (military decorations or honorary titles). A total of 977,000 servicemen were killed in action. More than 100,000 soldiers and officers received awards for gallantry in the face of the enemy, and 295 servicemen were awarded the "Hero of the Soviet Union" title.

=== Cold War ===
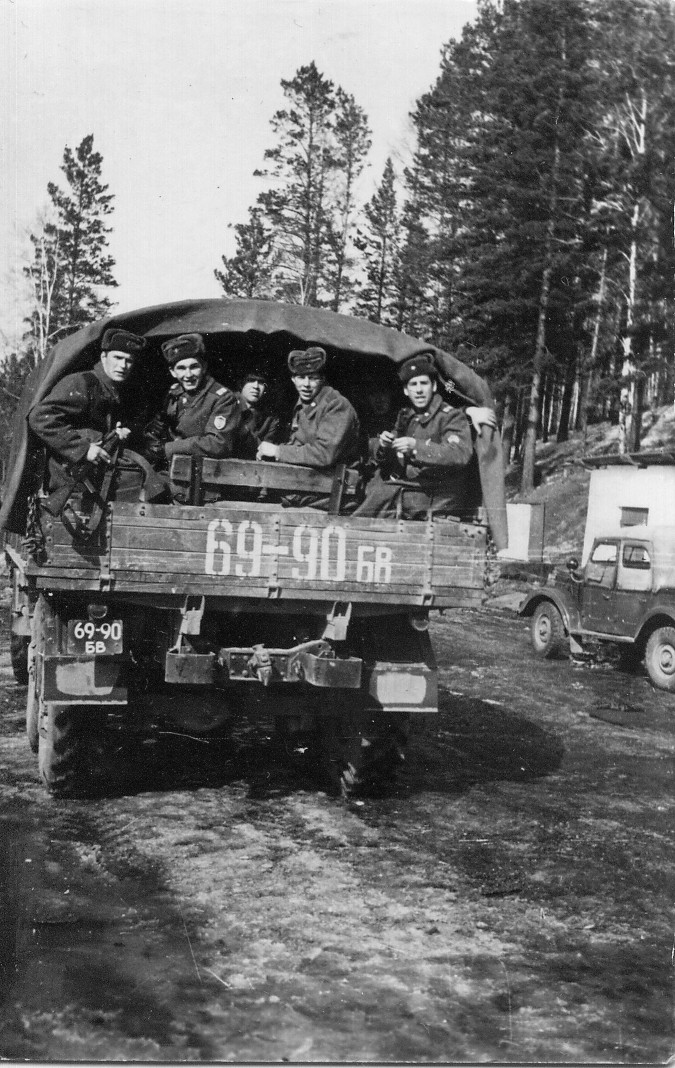
Internal troops in the 1970s

After World War II ended, the Internal Troops played an important role in fighting local anti-Soviet partisans in the Baltic states (such as the Forest Brothers) and the Ukrainian Insurgent Army. In 1953, the internal troops suppressed the Vorkuta labor camp uprising with gunfire, which resulted in death of at least 100 political prisoners. A series of internal troops districts supervised many divisions, brigades, regiments, and battalions. Among them was the headquarters for internal troops in the Baltic area, which became Directorate Internal Troops NKVD-MVD-MGB Baltic Military District (Управление ВВ НКВД-МВД-МГБ Прибалтийского округа). This headquarters supervised several internal troops divisions, including the 14th Railway Facilities Protection Division from 1944 to 1951. Other divisions in the Baltic Military District included the 4th, 5th, and 63rd NKVD Rifle Divisions.

In the last months of the war and from 1945-1950, units of the internal troops also operated outside the borders of the USSR, ensuring the security of the rear of the active army, order in populated areas in the months of the formation of military and civil authorities after the war, participating in combat operations against the nationalist and anti-Soviet underground. On March 15, 1946, the NKVD was split into two organizations: Ministry of Internal Affairs and the Ministry of State Security. On January 21, 1947, the internal troops of the MVD (operational units) were reassigned to the Ministry of State Security. The escort troops remained part of the MVD of the USSR. On July 10, 1949, the escort units were assigned to escort prisoners to judicial institutions, to exchange points on scheduled railway routes in republican, regional and provincial centers. On May 6, 1951, by the resolution of the Council of Ministers of the Soviet Union, the escort guard was assigned the task of transporting prisoners and defendants by scheduled (special) convoys along railway and waterways, as well as moving them from prisons to camps and colonies; also, at the request of the Prosecutor's Office and law enforcement agencies, they were assigned the task of escorting them to court hearings of the Supreme, regional, provincial courts, military tribunals, and liner courts by rail and water transport; escorting them to train cars at exchange points.

Following the death of Joseph Stalin and the beginning of the Khrushchev era and de-Stalinisation, the internal troops were reduced in size, but retained their pre-war functions. The Internal and Escort Guard was divided into departments, which in turn consisted of detachments, divisions, teams, and groups. By 1957, the number of Internal Guards amounted to 55,715 people, the Escort Guard - 33,307 people, and the formed Escort Guard of places of detention which included 100,000 people. On January 13, 1960, the Council of Ministers of the Soviet Union abolished the Ministry of Internal Affairs of the Soviet Union, transferring its functions to the ministries of internal affairs of the union republics. Accordingly, the internal troops were distributed among the union republics and subordinated to the republican ministries of internal affairs on a regional basis. On August 30, 1962, the Presidium of the Supreme Soviet of the RSFSR reorganized the Republican Ministry of Internal Affairs into the Ministry of Public Order Protection of the RSFSR (Министерство охраны общественного порядка (МООП); Ministerstvo okhrany obshchestvennogo poriadka — MOOP). The same was done in all Union and autonomous republics of the Soviet Union. The internal troops were reassigned to the Republican MOOPs. On July 26, 1966, by Decree of the Presidium of the Supreme Soviet of the Soviet Union, the central law enforcement agency was restored in the form of the Ministry of Public Order Protection of the USSR (MOOP USSR). The internal troops were included in the MOOP USSR. On November 25, 1968, the MOOP USSR was renamed the Ministry of Internal Affairs of the USSR. The internal troops again found themselves in the structure of the MVD of the USSR. In 1969, the internal troops were managed by the Main Department of Internal Troops MVD of the USSR. By an order of the Ministry of Internal Affairs number 007 of 22 February 1969 on the basis of the internal troops, Internal and Escort of the Interior Ministry of the Ukrainian SSR, the Ukrainian SSR and the Moldavian SSR MVD internal troops directorates were officially established.

On December 29, 1977 the Special Purpose Training Company (known in its Russian acronym УРСН) was created. It was the first spetsnaz unit in the internal troops of the Soviet Union. In this company the traditions of the special forces of the Internal Troops of the Ministry of Internal Affairs were born and this company served as the foundation for the future creation of all special forces units of the internal troops and subsequently the internal troops of Russia. It was on the basis of the UchbSpN, after the company was reformed into a battalion, based on which the Vityaz unit was formed. On September 1986, following the hijacking of airplane in Ufa Airport, commander-in-chief of the internal troops, General Ivan Yakovlev was forced to resign. On March 21, 1989, by decree of the Presidium of the Supreme Soviet of the Soviet Union, the internal troops of the Soviet Union (along with the Soviet Border Troops and the Railway Troops) were withdrawn from the Soviet Armed Forces. By decree of the President of the RSFSR, Boris Yeltsin, issued on October 20, 1991, all formations of the internal troops stationed on the territory of the Russian Soviet Federative Socialist Republic were accepted under the jurisdiction of the RSFSR and subordinated to the republican MVD. On December 25, 1991, as a result of the collapse of the Soviet Union, the internal troops of the Soviet Union ceased to exist. Units and formations of the internal troops, depending on their territorial deployment, became part of the respective interior ministries and armed forces of the newly formed Commonwealth of Independent States member states. In the Russian Federation, the internal troops of Russia were the successor of the Soviet internal troops, themselves reformed into the National Guard of Russia in 2016.

== Combat history ==
=== Participation of the internal troops in mass resettlements ===
In the initial and final stages of the war, the internal troops were used for the mass resettlement (deportation) of peoples who, by decision of the Soviet leadership, were considered accomplices of the enemy. For this purpose, in a short time, huge masses of people on ethnic grounds were taken from the western and central regions of the Soviet Union to the eastern regions (Siberia, the Kazakh SSR and Central Asia). All movements, escorting and protection of the deported contingent were assigned to the internal troops of the NKVD. Examples of such mass deportations include:

- Deportation of Germans to the USSR in 1941 — 446,480 people
- Deportation of the Soviet Greeks from 1942 to 1949 — 15,000 people
- Deportation of the Chechens and Ingush in 1944 — 496,000 people
- Deportation of the Meskhetian Turks in 1944 — 115,000 people
- Deportation of the Crimean Tatars in 1944 — 183,155 people

The deportation required the participation of significant forces of the internal troops. For example, the deportation of Chechens and Ingush required a group of internal troops with a total of 100,000 servicemen.

=== Combating nationalist independence movements ===
In the Baltic states, Western Belorussia, Western Ukraine, and Bessarabia, there were underground independence movements that fought against the Soviet occupation. The Soviet regime utilized the internal troops in these lands. Internal troops had to fight them from the moment that the Soviet Union re-occupied those territories after Nazi Germany's occupation.

Examples of such nationalist movements include:

- Forest Brothers in the Baltic states — from 1940 to 1957;
- Home Army — from 1942 to the mid-1950s;
- Ukrainian Insurgent Army — from 1944 to 1954;
- Belarusian Liberation Army — from 1944 to 1955.

Partially due to the efforts of the Internal Troops, the Soviet regime managed to temporarily stop the independence movements in the Soviet-occupied territories as many of the armed resistance members were killed by the end of the 1950s.

=== Suppression of mass riots ===
In the post-war period, mass riots repeatedly broke out in the USSR, caused by social tensions, inter ethnic differences, illegal actions of the authorities and many other reasons. In all cases, the internal troops (in rare cases, units of the Soviet Army) were called in to manage mass riots. Examples of mass riots with serious consequences in the liquidation of which the Internal Troops of the USSR Ministry of Internal Affairs participated are:

- Mass riots in Novorossiysk in 1956
- Mass riots in Grozny in 1958
- Uprising in Temirtau in 1959
- Mass riots in Krasnodar in 1961
- Mass riots in Beslan in 1961
- Mass riots in Murom in 1961
- Mass riots in Novocherkassk in 1962
- Mass riots in Nalchik in 1968
- Mass riots in Ordzhonikidze in 1981
- December events in Alma-Ata in 1986
- Mass riots in Sukhumi in 1989
- Tbilisi events in 1989

Also, escort units of the internal troops had to pacify mass riots, which sometimes occurred in correctional institutions among prisoners such as the Mass riots in colonies near Tolyatti in 1970

=== De-escalation of interethnic conflicts ===
A special column in the history of the internal troops is noted for their participation in separating the parties in interethnic conflicts that began to flare up in different places of the Soviet Union in the late 80s. Examples of such interethnic conflicts with grave consequences are:

- The Nagorno-Karabakh conflict, which began in 1988
- Events in Novy Uzen in 1989
- Fergana massacre of 1989
- Baku pogrom in 1990
- Events in Gagauzia in 1990
- Events in Osh in 1990
- Mass riots in Dushanbe in 1990

In many cases, internal troops had to separate the opposing forces and disarm illegal armed formations, as well as pacify the local population, which opposed the central authorities for separatist purposes.

=== Failed attempts to suppress 1990s independence movements ===
As the Soviet occupation of the Baltic states was being challenged more and more, the internal troops were used by the Soviet occupiers without success to prop up the failing and unpopular Soviet regime:

- January Events in Vilnius and elsewhere in 1991, where Soviet troops killed 14 civilians
- Events in Riga in 1991

== Structure ==
At the beginning of 1969 in the MVD were:

- Internal troops directorates (UVV) of the MVD of the Ukrainian SSR and the Moldavian SSR
- OMSDON Independent Special-Purpose Motorized Rifle Division "Felix Dzerzhinky" (Reutov, Moscow Oblast).
- 19th, 36th (Moscow), 43rd (Minsk), 44th (Leningrad), 54th (Rostov-on-Don), 79th (Kirov), 80th (Kuibyshev), 83rd (Syktyvkar), 84th (Perm), 87th (Sverdlovsk), 88th (Tashkent), 89th (Novosibirsk), 90th (Kemerovo), 91st (Irkutsk), and 92nd (Khabarovsk) Convoy Divisions
- Guard brigades and regiments
- Special motorized militia units
- Military academies

Ten other convoy divisions were formed up to the 1990s; 42nd (Vilnius), 68th Division (Gorky), 75th (Alma-Ata), 86th, 101st, 102nd, 38th, 39th, 48th, 50th, 76th and 77th Convoy Division (Petrovsky). On January 11, 1978, was established Interior Ministry forces in the Far East and Eastern Siberia. On April 23, 1979, on the basis of Headquarters 89th Convoy Division (Novosibirsk's Military Unit Number 7540) was created the Directorate of Internal Troops (UVV) MIA Western Siberia (with the inclusion of the 90th and 102nd convoy divisions). On the basis of the 44th Convoy Division the UVV MIA North-West and the Baltic States was created. In December 1968, when the MOOP was reorganized into the MVD, the division into troops and guards was eliminated. The internal and escort guard of the MVD were also included in the internal troops. The Internal and Escort Guard formations again acquired a troop structure. On November 28, 1968, by order of the minister of interior, the Escort Guard departments were transformed into escort divisions, and the Internal Guard departments were transformed into divisions of the USCh GUVV (Directorate of Special Units of the Main Directorate of Internal Troops). Detachments were reorganized into regiments, divisions into battalions, teams into companies, and groups into platoons. In 1966, to assist the police in emergency situations, special motorized police units were created in many large cities of the USSR (3 special motorized police regiments and 40 separate battalions).

Since the late 1970s, regional directorates of the internal troops have been created. By the early 1990s, the following directorates existed:

- Directorate for the Northwest and the Baltics (Leningrad);
- Directorate for the North Caucasus and Transcaucasia (Rostov-on-Don);
- Directorate for the Ukrainian SSR and the Moldavian SSR (Kyiv);
- Directorate for Central Asia and Kazakhstan (Alma-Ata);
- Directorate for the Far East and Eastern Siberia (Khabarovsk);
- Directorate for Western Siberia (Novosibirsk);
- Directorate for the Urals (Sverdlovsk);
- Directorate for the Volga Region (Kuibyshev);
- Directorate for the Central Zone (Moscow);
- Directorate of Special Units (USCh).

The Directorate of Special Units (USCh) had under its control all formations of the internal troops, which were engaged in tasks related to the protection of especially important strategic objects of the USSR transport system and industry, such as:

- Creation of a restricted area around closed administrative-territorial entities
- Protection of nuclear power plants
- Protection of important state objects on the transport route of the Baikal–Amur Mainline, Far Eastern Railway and Transbaikal Railway
- Protection of oil and gas fields

By the time of the collapse of the USSR, the internal troops (in addition to separate brigades, regiments and battalions) included 31 divisions, of which:

- 20 escort divisions
- 2 operational divisions
- 9 divisions of the Directorate of Special Units

After the Chernobyl disaster in 1986, internal troops personnel, including members of both the Russian and Ukrainian branches, were among the cleanup crews ('liquidators'), engaged in security and emergency management activities; hundreds of servicemen were exposed to heavy radiation and dozens died. By 1989, with the increasing popular discontent nationwide that had begun to manifest in the USSR, the internal troops of the MVD, on orders from the Presidum of the Supreme Soviet, officially became a reporting agency of the MVD after years as a part of the Ministry of Defense. On 1 October 1989, the Ground Forces' 14th Tank Division at Novocherkassk (Rostov Oblast) was transferred into the MVD as the 100th Motorised Division for Special Use VV MVD SSSR. Prior to the 1990s, there were 180 regiments (of varying size) of internal troops, of which 90 were mainly guards of correctional institutions, important public facilities and public order. Some of them became engaged in the ethnic conflicts that occurred during the Dissolution of the Soviet Union. Their activities during this period included the 1989 violent incident in Tbilisi when internal troops servicemen used entrenching shovels to decimate a crowd of unarmed Georgian civilians.

== Educational institutions ==
- Novosibirsk Higher Military Command School
- Ordzhonikidze Higher Military Command Red Banner School
- Perm Higher Military Command School
- Saratov Higher Military Command Red Banner School
- Kharkiv Higher Military School
- Tashkent Higher Military Technical School
- Leningrad Higher Political School

== Uniforms ==
On October 20, 1970, by order No. 351, the Minister of Internal Affairs of the Soviet Union, Nikolai Shchelokov, established a uniform for servicemen of the internal troops, in which the main distinguishing feature of the departmental affiliation of the troops was the maroon colour (dark burgundy colour) in the details of the uniform. The specified color was present on the shoulder straps, buttonholes, sleeve emblems, jacket piping and trouser stripes, cap band and piping. Subsequently, this dark burgundy colour symbolically took root in the internal troops. When special forces units appeared in the Soviet internal troops in 1978, maroon berets were chosen as a distinctive headdress for special forces fighters. At the same time, the beret, as a headdress (for male military personnel), and moreover of this color, was in no way included in the rules for wearing military uniforms introduced in the internal troops at that time.

== Commanders ==
Due to the continuous reorganization and reassignment of the internal troops, their structure and positions of troop leaders changed very often. Throughout the years it was known in the following titles: since 1918 - chiefs of staff of the Corps of Troops of the Checka, since 1919 - chief of staff of the troops of the internal security of the Republic, since 1919 - commander of the troops of the internal guard of the Republic, since 1921 - chief of the Directorate of Troops of the All-Russian Extraordinary Commission, since 1922 - chief of the Directorate of Troops of the GPU of the Republic, since 1923 - chief of the border guard department and chief inspector of the OGPU troops, since 1926 - chief of the Main Directorate of Border Guard and OGPU troops, since 1934 - heads of the Main Directorate of Border and Internal Security of the NKVD, since 1941 - heads of the Main Directorate of Internal Troops, since 1990 - commanders of the internal troops of the NKVD of the USSR (1941-1946), the Ministry of Internal Affairs of the USSR (1946-1947, 1953-1960, 1968-1991), MGB USSR (1947-1953), MOOP USSR (1966-1968), MVD USSR (1966-1991):

- Vasily Kamenshchikov (July–August 1918)
- Ivan Polukakov (August–September 1918)
- Konstantin Volobuev (October 1918 – June 1920)
- Vasily Kornev (June 1920 – February 1921)
- Mikhail Rozen (March–April 1921)
- Porfiry Studenikin (June–December 1921)
- Ferenc Pataki (December 1921 – July 1922)
- Erzam Kadomtsev (July–October 1922)
- Yan Olsky (September 1923 – December 1925)
- Zinovy Katznelson (December 1925 – April 1929)
- Sergei Velezhev (April–November 1929)
- Ivan Vorontsov (November 1929 – July 1931)
- Nikolai Bystrykh (July 1931 – April 1933)
- Corps Commander (since 1935) Mikhail Frinovsky (April 1933 – April 1937)
- Division Commander Nikolai Kruchinkin (April 1937 – January 1938)
- Division Commander Aleksandr Kovalyov (January 1938 – February 1939)
- Division Commander Grigory Sokolov (February–March 1939, Acting)
- Major General Arkady Apollonov (August–November 1941, Acting)
- Major General Aleksandr Gulyev (November 1941 – March 1942, Acting)
- Major General Ivan Sheredega (April 1942 – October 1944)
- Colonel General Arkady Apollonov (October 1944 – March 1946)
- Lieutenant General Pyotr Burmak (March 1946 – March 1953)
- Lieutenant General Taras Filippov (March 1953 – March 1955)
- Lieutenant General Alexander Sirotkin (September 1955 – June 1956)
- Lieutenant General Timofei Strokach (March 1956 – March 1957) [(Head of the Main Directorate of Border and Internal Troops)
- Lieutenant General Alerksandr Epanchin (March–April 1957, Wreed)
- Lieutenant General Semyon Donskov (April 1957 – January 1960)
- Lieutenant General Gennady Aleinikov (1960–1961)
- Lieutenant General Nikolai Pilshchuk (September 1961 – May 1968)
- Colonel General, since 1980 Army General Ivan Yakovlev (May 1968 – December 1986)
- Colonel General Yuri Shatalin (24 December 1986 – 21 September 1991)
- Colonel General Vasily Savvin (September 1991 – January 1992)
