= Internal troops =

Soviet and post-Soviet paramilitary force

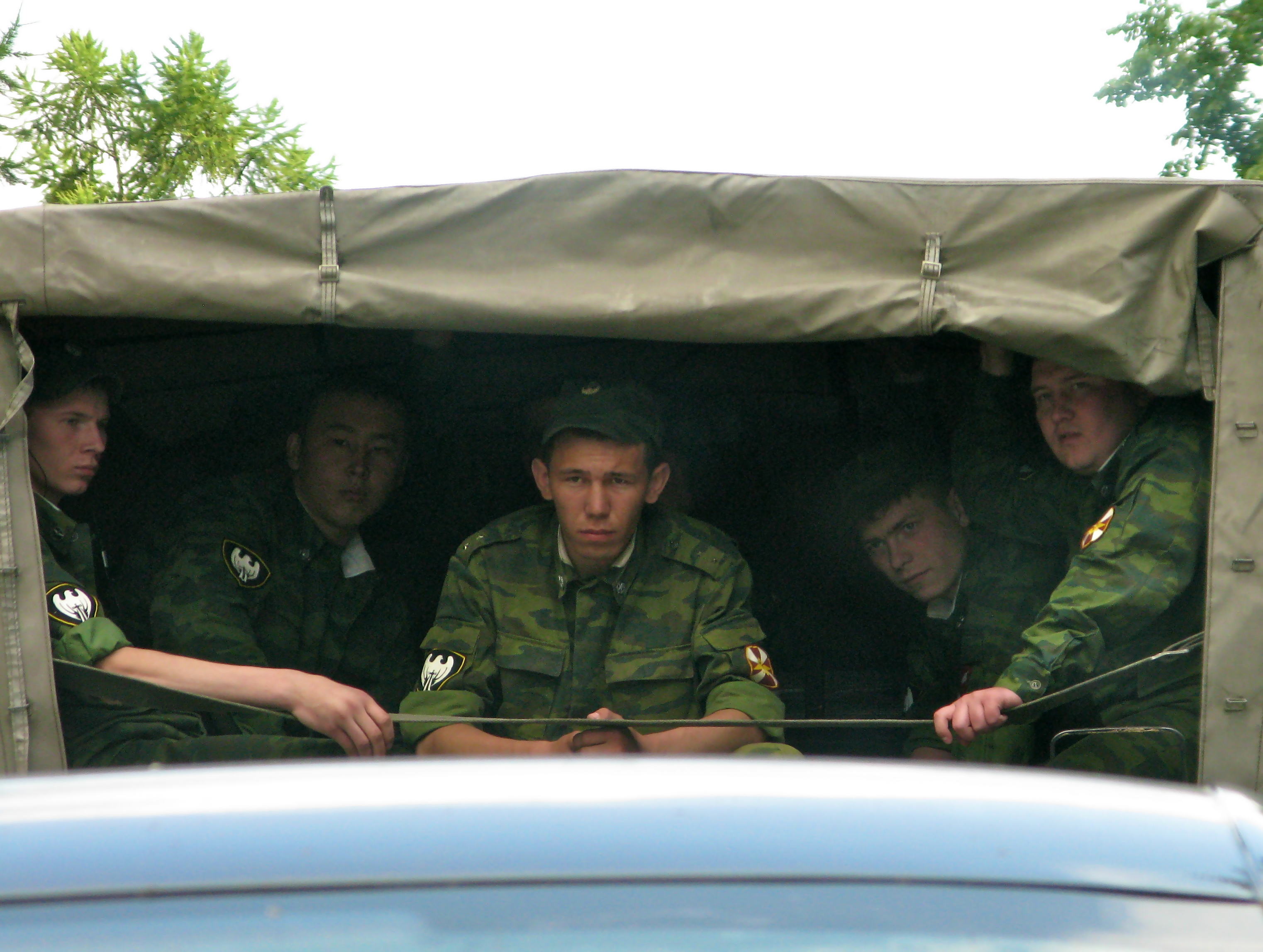
Internal Troops of Russia in 2009

Internal troops, sometimes alternatively translated as interior troops or interior ministry forces, are a type of military and gendarmerie-like law enforcement services in the post-Soviet states and former Soviet-aligned states. Internal troops are subordinated to the interior ministry (or interior minister) rather than the ministry of defence (or defence minister) and are responsible for internal security.

Interior troops originated in the Soviet Union and similar services were adopted by countries within the Soviet sphere of influence. Since the dissolution of the Soviet Union in 1991, internal troops in some post-Soviet states have been abolished and replaced with a national guard service. Current states with internal troops include Azerbaijan, Belarus, Kyrgyzstan, Tajikistan, and Turkmenistan. Former states include Armenia (until 2002), Georgia (until 2004), Ukraine (until 2014), Kazakhstan (until 2014), and Russia (until 2016). Mongolia abolished its internal troops service in 2014 but refounded it as a reserve force of the Mongolian Armed Forces in 2017.

== History ==
The Russian internal troops were formed in 1919 under the Cheka (later NKVD, and were known as "NKVD Troops", formerly the "Internal Security Forces" (Russian: Voyska vnutrenney okhrany Respubliki or VOKhR)), remained there with all the mergers and splittings of Soviet state security services and ended up under the control of the police-like MVD. The best-known of the internal troops divisions is OMSDON based near Moscow which traces its roots to the "OSNAZ" detachment of the VChK (formerly 1st Automobile Fighting Detachment of the VTsIK). It was later reorganized into the DON (Special-Purpose Division) of the OGPU and the NKVD.

These forces were introduced during the Soviet era, initially to provide armed, tactical support for the militsiya, the equivalent of the major police organizations found in other countries. Over time, internal troops also gained responsibility for safeguarding of highly-important facilities (like nuclear power plants), large-scale crowd control and prison security. As such, these forces have been involved in major wars as well as combating insurgencies and other civil unrest, including the Russian Civil War, World War II, mass repressions of Stalinist era, and the Chechen Wars. During wartime, internal troops fall under armed forces military command and fulfill the missions of local defence and rear area security.

=== Internal troops outside Soviet Union ===
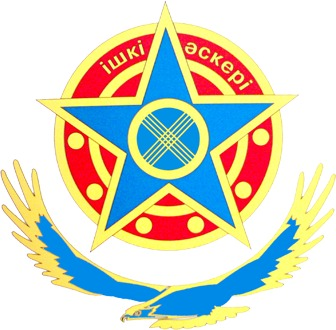
Emblem of the Internal Troops of Kazakhstan.

The pattern of internal troops was copied by many countries of the Warsaw Pact. In 1945 in Poland the Internal Security Corps was established, in East Germany a similar unit or the Volkspolizei-Bereitschaft ("People's Police Alert Units") was created in 1955. These units were created for a further reason as well: to have additional ground troop capacities in the event of a war, that did not show up at armaments negotiations, because those internal troops were not part of the military and still had suitable and compatible equipment. There were also internal troops in Bulgaria.

During Cold War the West German Bundesgrenzschutz /BGS (Federal Border Guard) was a paramilitary police with infantry units as well, for a short period there was even a mandatory service in force.

== Current deployments ==
After the dissolution of Soviet Union in 1990–91, local internal troops units were resubordinated to the respective new independent states, except for the three Baltic states. Azerbaijan (Internal Troops of Azerbaijan), Kazakhstan, the Russian Federation (Internal Troops of Russia), Tajikistan (Tajik Internal Troops) and Ukraine (Internal Troops of Ukraine) retained the name, organization and tasks of their internal troops. Up until December 2002, Armenia maintained a Ministry of Internal Affairs, but along with the Ministry of National Security, it was reorganised as a non-ministerial institution (the two organisations became the Police of Armenia and the National Security Service). Georgia detached a militarized branch from its Ministry of Internal Affairs and transferred its former internal troops under the command of the Ministry of Defence in November 2004. The Internal Troops of Kazakhstan was dissolved in April 2014 and was replaced with the National Guard of Kazakhstan.

Modern internal troops can partly be compared with riot police forces all over the world.

In 2014 the Ukrainian internal troops were disbanded due the negative reputation gained during the Euromaidan and as part of a general military and governmental reform. They were reorganized into the National Guard of Ukraine (NGU), which still serves in similar role to the internal troops.

In 2016, the Russian internal troops, as well other units under the Russian Ministry of Interior—mainly SOBR and OMON—were transferred and merged under a new organization named the National Guard of Russia (Rosgvardiya). Differently from the old Interior Troops, the Rosgvardiya is not subordinated to the Ministry of Internal Affairs (MVD), but directly subordinated to the President of Russia.

== General organization ==
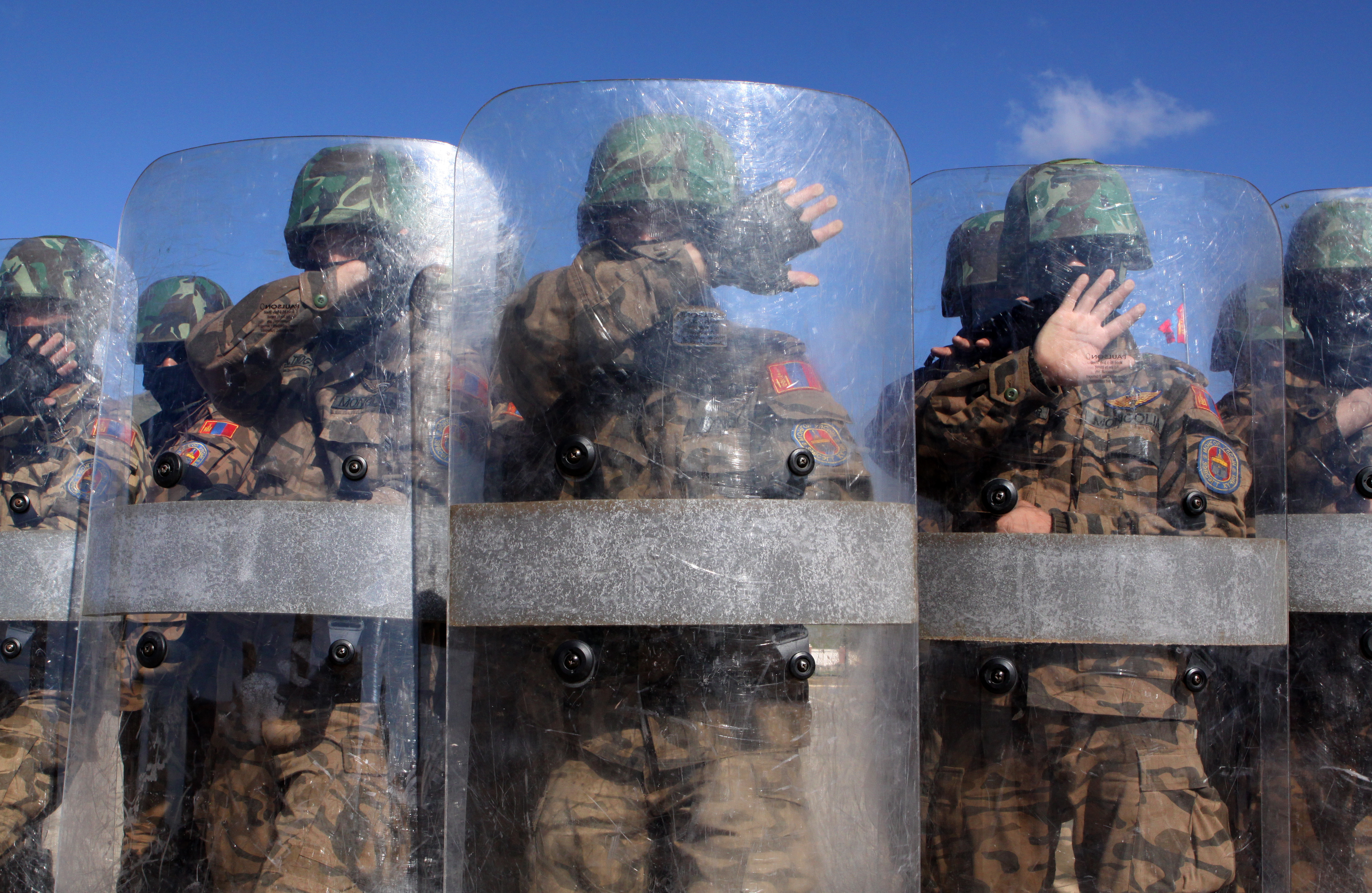
Members of the Mongolian internal troops

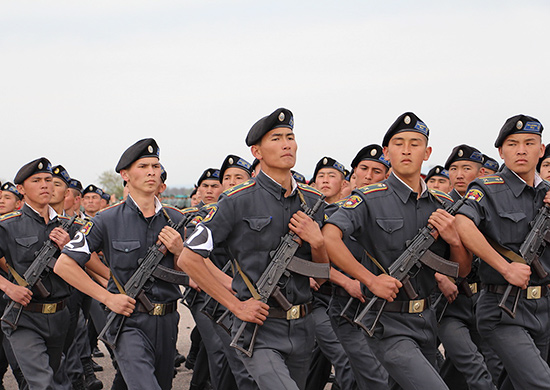
Kyrgyz internal troops during a rehearsal for a Victory Day Parade in Bishkek in 2015.

Despite being subordinated to a civilian police authority, internal troops are a military force with centralized system of ranks, command and service. The chief commander and staff of the Troops report only to the Ministry of Internal Affairs, maintaining their separate chain of command. Soviet VV units were predominantly formed up of conscripts drafted by the same system as for the Soviet Army. Modern troops in Russia and Ukraine are experiencing a slow transition to the contract personnel system. VV officers are trained in both own special academies and the army's military academies.

The main kinds of internal troops are field units, prison security units, various facility-guarding units and special forces like Rus. Since the 1980s, the several special forces units that developed within the VV, were created to deal with terrorism and hostage crises. Fields units are essentially light motorized infantry, similar to respective regular army units by their organization and weapons.

Soviet prison security units (Russian: конвойные войска, konvoinyie voyska; criminal slang: vertuhai) originally consisted of the units that guard the perimeters of the prisons, and the prisoner transport teams (actually konvoi, literally "convoy"). In post-Soviet countries, some or all of the prison-related tasks were transferred to other agencies.

== Internal troops in popular culture ==
The Guard is a Soviet 1990 drama film, based on the real story of VV soldier who killed his entire prisoner transport unit as a result of dedovschina (brutal hazing system).

== Equipment ==
=== Helicopters ===
- Mil Mi-6 Hook
- Mil Mi-8 Hip
- Mil Mi-24 Hind

== See also ==
- Internal Troops of the Soviet Union
- Internal Security Corps (Poland)
- Internal Defense Forces (Poland)
- National Guard
- Volkspolizei-Bereitschaft (East Germany)
- People's Armed Police (China)
- Special Corps of Gendarmes (Russian Empire)
- Social Security Forces (North Korea)
- Intervention Police (Hungary)
- Sarandoy (Democratic Republic of Afghanistan)
