= 181st Rifle Division =

WW2 Soviet Red Army formation

- Russian: 181-я стрелковая дивизия Latvian: 181. strēlnieku divīzija
- Active: 1st formation: August 1940-16 October 1941 (Disbanded, reorganized into 183rd Infantry Division); 2nd formation: 1942-August 1942; 3rd formation: February 1943-May 1945
- Country: Soviet Union
- Branch: Red Army
- Type: Infantry
- Engagements: World War II

Commanders
- First commander: Major-General Jānis Liepiņš (1940-1941)
- Second commander: Colonel Peter Vasiliyevich Borisov (03.06.1941 — 17.07.1941)
- Third commander: Colonel Aleksey Stepanovich Frolov (18.07.1941 — 29.09.1941)

The 181st Rifle Division was an infantry division of the Soviet Red Army during World War II that was active from 1940-1945. It was created from former units of the Latvian Army after the Soviet occupation of Latvia.

== First formation ==
It was formed in August–September 1940, after the occupation and forced annexation of Latvia to the USSR, based on the 1st Kurzeme Infantry Division and the 2nd Vidzeme Infantry Division of the Latvian Army (renamed People's Army of Latvia in the summer of 1940 shortly before disbandment). The division wore the old uniforms of the Latvian Army with Soviet insignia and were also equipped with weaponry of the former army, which made them stand out from other units of the Red Army. It became part of the 24th Rifle Corps and was stationed in Riga.

It was part of the 'operational army' during World War II from 22 June 1941 to 16 October 1941.

On June 22, 1941, it was stationed at summer camps in the Gulbene area in an abbreviated format. Here until July 29, the division was expanded to full wartime strength.

From the beginning of the Nazi German-Soviet war, desertion of Latvians began, and from June 29, 1941, according to some sources, they began their demobilization. More precisely, Latvians were simply released from house to house, previously disarmed - all more than 2,000 people (mostly from old time required). The division was completed with personnel of the interior regions of the USSR. The main body (about 30% of the total force) came from the central and southern areas of the current Pskov Oblast. However, the core personnel were Latvian. The combat training level of the Latvian Riflemen was quite high - many of them received awards and honors from the commanders in the war, including for their period of stay in the 181st Division.

The division was wiped out at Staraya Russa in September 1941.

The division was formally disbanded after defeats during Operation Barbarossa on 16 October 1941.

== Second formation ==
It was briefly recreated at Stalingrad, wiped out at Kalach in August 1942.

== Third formation ==
Created again at Chelyabinsk from the 10th Rifle Division NKVD in February 1943, fought at Demyansk, Korosten, and in Poland and Germany. Later the division was assigned to the 6th Army of the 1st Ukrainian Front in May 1945.

== Organization in 1941 ==
Organization of the division in 1941:

- Headquarters
- 186th Rifle Regiment
- 195th Rifle Regiment
- 243rd Rifle Regiment
- 639th Light Artillery Regiment
- 640th Howitzer Artillery Regiment
- 16th Anti-Tank Battalion
- 186th Anti-Aircraft Battalion
- 113th Reconnaissance Battalion
- 296th Engineer Battalion
- 169th Signal Battalion
- 202nd Medical Battalion
- 29th Supply Battalion
- 257th Chemical Defense Company
