= NKVD =

Secret police of the Soviet Union (1934–1946)

Coordinates: 55.7606°N 37.6281°E

People's Commissariat of Internal Affairs (NKVD)
- Народный комиссариат внутренних дел
- NKVD emblem

Agency overview
- Formed: 10 July 1934; 92 years ago
- Preceding agencies: NKVD of the RSFSR; OGPU
- Dissolved: 15 March 1946; 80 years ago
- Superseding agencies: Ministry of Internal Affairs (MVD); Ministry of State Security (MGB)
- Type: Interior ministry; Secret police; Intelligence agency; Law enforcement; Gendarmerie; Border guard; Prison authority
- Jurisdiction: Soviet Union
- Headquarters: 11-13 ulitsa Bol. Lubyanka, Moscow, RSFSR, Soviet Union
- Agency executives: Genrikh Yagoda (1934–1936); Nikolai Yezhov (1936–1938); Lavrentiy Beria (1938–1945); Sergei Kruglov (1945–1946)
- Parent agency: Council of People's Commissars
- Child agencies: Main Directorate of State Security (GUGB); Main Directorate of Camps (Gulag); Main Directorate of Militsiya (GURKM); Main Directorate of Border and Internal Security (GUPiVO); Internal troops

The People's Commissariat for Internal Affairs (Russian: Народный комиссариат внутренних дел, romanized: Narodnyy komissariat vnutrennikh del, IPA: [nɐˈrodnɨj kəmʲɪsərʲɪˈat ˈvnutrʲɪnʲɪɣ dʲel]), abbreviated as NKVD (Russian: НКВД;), was both the interior ministry and the secret police of the Soviet Union from 1934 to 1946. The agency was formed to succeed the Joint State Political Directorate (OGPU) secret police organization, and thus had a monopoly on intelligence and state security functions. The NKVD is known for carrying out political repression and the Great Purge under Joseph Stalin, as well as counterintelligence and other operations on the Eastern Front of World War II. The head of the NKVD was Genrikh Yagoda from 1934 to 1936, Nikolai Yezhov from 1936 to 1938, Lavrentiy Beria from 1938 to 1946, and Sergei Kruglov in 1946.

First established in 1917 as the NKVD of the Russian SFSR, the ministry was tasked with regular police work and overseeing the country's prisons and labor camps. It was disbanded in 1930, and its functions dispersed among other agencies before being reinstated as a commissariat of the Soviet Union in 1934. During the Great Purge in 1936–1938, on Stalin's orders, the NKVD conducted mass arrests, imprisonment, torture, and executions of hundreds of thousands of Soviet citizens. The agency sent millions to the Gulag system of forced labor camps and, during World War II, carried out the mass deportations of hundreds of thousands of Poles, Balts, and Romanians, and millions of ethnic minorities from the Caucasus, to remote areas of the country, resulting in millions of deaths. Hundreds of thousands of NKVD personnel served in Internal Troops divisions in defensive battles alongside the Red Army, as well as in "blocking formations," preventing retreat. The agency was responsible for foreign assassinations, including that of Leon Trotsky.

Within 1941 and from 1943 to 1946, secret police functions were split into the People's Commissariat for State Security (NKGB). In March 1946, the People's Commissariats were renamed to Ministries; the NKVD became the Ministry of Internal Affairs (MVD), and the NKGB became the Ministry of State Security (MGB).

== History and structure ==
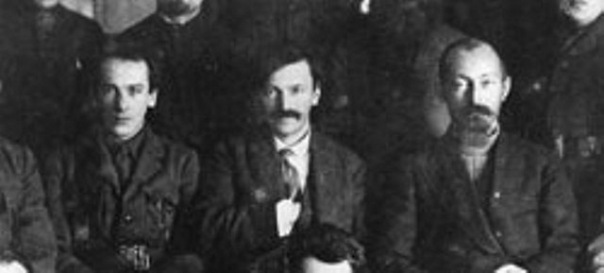
Early NKVD leaders, Genrikh Yagoda, then 1st deputy head of SOU OGPU Vyacheslav Menzhinsky then head of SOU OGPU and deputy head OGPU, and Felix Dzerzhinsky chief of OGPU, 1924

After the Russian February Revolution of 1917, the Provisional Government dissolved the Tsarist police and set up the People's Militias. The subsequent Russian October Revolution of 1917 saw a seizure of state power led by Lenin and the Bolsheviks, who established a new Bolshevik regime, the Russian Socialist Federative Soviet Republic (RSFSR). The Provisional Government's Ministry of Internal Affairs (MVD), formerly under Georgy Lvov (from March 1917) and then under Nikolai Avksentiev (from 6 August [O.S. 24 July] 1917) and Alexei Niketan (from 8 October [O.S. 25 September] 1917), turned into NKVD (People's Commissariat of Internal Affairs) under a People's Commissar. However, the NKVD apparatus was overwhelmed by duties inherited from MVD, such as the supervision of the local governments and firefighting, and the Workers' and Peasants' Militias staffed by proletarians were largely inexperienced and unqualified. Realizing that it was left with no capable security force, the Council of People's Commissars of the RSFSR established (20 December [O.S. 7 December] 1917) a secret political police, the Cheka, led by Felix Dzerzhinsky. It gained the right to undertake quick non-judicial trials and executions if that was deemed necessary in order to "protect the Russian socialist-communist revolution."

The Cheka was reorganized in 1922, as the State Political Directorate, or GPU, of the NKVD of the RSFSR. In 1922 the USSR formed, with the RSFSR as its largest member. The GPU became the OGPU (Joint State Political Directorate), under the Council of People's Commissars of the USSR. The NKVD of the RSFSR retained control of the militsiya and various other responsibilities.

In 1934, the NKVD of the RSFSR was transformed into an all-USSR security force, the NKVD (which the Communist Party of the Soviet Union leaders soon came to call "the leading detachment of our party"), and the OGPU was incorporated into the NKVD as the Main Directorate for State Security (GUGB); the separate NKVD of the RSFSR was not resurrected until 1946 (as the MVD of the RSFSR). As a result, the NKVD also took over control of all detention facilities (including the forced labor camps, known as the gulag), as well as the regular police. At various times, the NKVD had the following Chief Directorates, abbreviated as "ГУ"—Главное управление, Glavnoye upravleniye.

ГУГБ – государственной безопасности, of State Security (GUGB, Glavnoye upravleniye gosudarstvennoi bezopasnosti)
ГУРКМ – рабоче-крестьянской милиции, of Workers and Peasants Militsiya (GURKM, Glavnoye upravleniye raboče-krest'yanskoi militsyi)
ГУПВО – пограничной и внутренней охраны, of Border and Internal Guards (GUPVO, GU pograničnoi i vnytrennei okhrany)
ГУПО – пожарной охраны, of Firefighting Services (GUPO, GU požarnoi okhrany)
ГУШосДор – шоссейных дорог, of Highways (GUŠD, GU šosseynykh dorog)
ГУЖД – железных дорог, of Railways (GUŽD, GU železnykh dorog)
ГУЛаг– Главное управление исправительно-трудовых лагерей и колоний, of Correctional Labour Camps (GULag, Glavnoye upravleniye lagerey i kolonii)
ГЭУ – экономическое, of Economics (GEU, Glavnoye ekonomičeskoie upravleniye)
ГТУ – транспортное, of Transport (GTU, Glavnoye transportnoie upravleniye)
ГУВПИ – военнопленных и интернированных, of POWs and interned persons (GUVPI, Glavnoye upravleniye voyennoplennikh i internirovannikh)

In 1934, 38.5% (36 cadres) of the leadership of the NKVD was Jewish, of which managed seven of its ten main departments. The rest were Russians, who made up 31.3% (30), 7% (7) Latvian, 5.2% (5) Ukrainian, 4.2% (4) Polish, 3% (3) Georgian, 3% Belarusian, 2% German and 5% other. In 1937, this had shifted slightly to 37.8% Jewish, 31.5% Russian, 7.2% Latvian, the rest other and twelve out of twenty main directorates being headed by Jews as well as seven of its ten main departments.

After 1938 during the Third Five Year Plan and the removal of Yezhov as NKVD head, the percentage of Jews collapsed within the organisation, making up only 3.9% of its management cadre in 1939.

=== Yezhov era ===
Until the reorganization begun by Nikolai Yezhov with a purge of the regional political police in the autumn of 1936 and formalized by a May 1939 directive of the All-Union NKVD by which all appointments to the local political police were controlled from the center, there was frequent tension between centralized control of local units and the collusion of those units with local and regional party elements, frequently resulting in the thwarting of Moscow's plans.

During Yezhov's time in office, the Great Purge reached its height. In the years 1937 and 1938 alone, at least 1.3 million were arrested and 681,692 were executed for 'crimes against the state'. The Gulag population swelled by 685,201 under Yezhov, nearly tripling in size in just two years, with at least 140,000 of these prisoners (and likely many more) dying of malnutrition, exhaustion and the elements.

On 3 February 1941, the 4th Department (Special Section, OO) of the GUGB NKVD security service responsible for the Soviet Armed Forces military counterintelligence, consisting of 12 sections and one investigation unit, was separated from the GUGB NKVD USSR.

The official liquidation of OO GUGB within NKVD was announced on 12 February by joint order No. 00151/003 of NKVD and NKGB USSR. The rest of GUGB was abolished, and staff were moved to the newly created People's Commissariat for State Security (NKGB). Departments of former GUGB were renamed directorates. For example, the foreign intelligence unit known as the Foreign Department (INO) became the Foreign Directorate (INU); the GUGB political police unit represented by the Secret Political Department (SPO) became the Secret Political Directorate (SPU), and so on. The former GUGB 4th Department (OO), was split into three sections. One section, which handled military counterintelligence in NKVD troops (former 11th Section of GUGB 4th Department OO) became the 3rd NKVD Department, or OKR (Otdel KontrRazvedki). The chief of OKR NKVD was Aleksander Belyanov.

After the German invasion of the Soviet Union (June 1941), the NKGB USSR was abolished, and on July 20, 1941, the units that formed the NKGB became part of the NKVD. The military CI was also upgraded from a department to a directorate and put in the NKVD organization as the Directorate of Special Departments, or UOO NKVD USSR. The NKVMF, however, did not return to the NKVD until January 11, 1942. It returned to NKVD control on January 11, 1942, as UOO 9th Department controlled by P. Gladkov. In April 1943, Directorate of Special Departments was transformed into SMERSH and transferred to the People's Defense and Commissariates. At the same time, the NKVD was reduced in size and duties again by converting the GUGB to an independent unit named the NKGB.

In 1946, all Soviet commissariats were renamed "ministries." Accordingly, the People's Commissariat of Internal Affairs (NKVD) of the USSR became the Ministry of Internal Affairs (MVD), while the NKGB was renamed the Ministry of State Security (MGB).

In 1953, after the arrest of Lavrenty Beria, the MGB merged back into the MVD. The police and security services finally split in 1954 to become:

- The USSR Ministry of Internal Affairs (MVD), responsible for the criminal militia and correctional facilities.
- The USSR Committee for State Security (KGB), responsible for the political police, intelligence, counterintelligence, personal protection (of the leadership), and confidential communications.

=== Main Directorates (Departments) ===
- State Security (GUGB — Russian: ГУГБ)
- Workers-Peasants Militsiya (Russian: ГУ РКМ)
- Border and Internal Security (Russian: ГУ ПиВО)
- Firefighting security (Russian: ГУПО)
- Correction and Labor camps (Russian: ГУЛАГ, romanized: GULAG)
- Other smaller departments
  - Department of Civil Registration (Russian: ЗАГС)
  - Financial (Russian: ФИНО, romanized: FINO)
  - Administration
  - Human resources
  - Secretariat
  - Special assignment

== Ranking system (State Security) ==
In 1935–1945, the Main Directorate of State Security of NKVD had its own ranking system before it was merged into the Soviet military standardized ranking system.

Top-level commanding staff

- Commissioner General of State Security (later in 1935)
- Commissioner of State Security, 1st Class
- Commissioner of State Security, 2nd Class
- Commissioner of State Security, 3rd Class
- Commissioner of State Security (Senior Major of State Security, before 1943)

Senior commanding staff

- Colonel of State Security (Major of State Security, before 1943)
- Lieutenant Colonel of State Security (Captain of State Security, before 1943)
- Major of State Security (Senior Lieutenant of State Security, before 1943)

Mid-level commanding staff

- Captain of State Security (Lieutenant of State Security, before 1943)
- Senior Lieutenant of State Security (Junior Lieutenant of State Security, before 1943)
- Lieutenant of State Security (Sergeant of State Security, before 1942)
- Junior Lieutenant of State Security (Sergeant of State Security, before 1942)

Junior commanding staff

- Master Sergeant of Special Service (from 1943)
- Senior Sergeant of Special Service (from 1943)
- Sergeant of Special Service (from 1944)
- Junior Sergeant of Special Service (from 1943)

== NKVD activities ==
The main function of the NKVD was to protect the state security of the Soviet Union through massive political repression, including authorized murders of many thousands of politicians and citizens, as well as kidnappings, assassinations, and mass deportations.

=== Domestic repressions ===
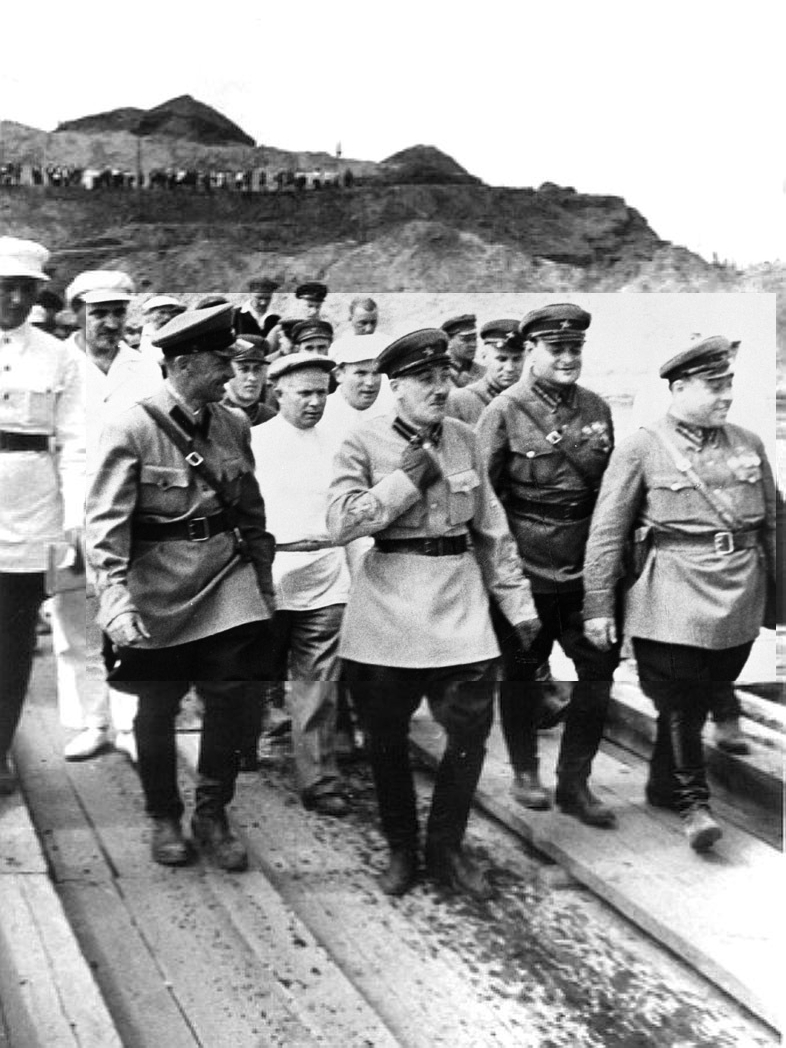
NKVD chief Genrikh Yagoda (middle) inspecting construction of what was then called the Moskva-Volga Canal, 1935. Behind him is Nikita Khrushchev

In implementation of Soviet internal policy towards perceived enemies of the Soviet state ("enemies of the people"), many people were sent to GULAG camps, and hundreds of thousands were executed by the NKVD. Formally, most of these people were convicted by NKVD troikas ("triplets") – special courts martial. Evidence standards were very low: a tip-off by an anonymous informer was considered sufficient grounds for arrest. Analyses refer to the NKVD as an "inquisition" with "inquisitors". A special decree of the state sanctioned the use of "physical means of persuasion" (torture), which opened the door to numerous abuses, documented in recollections of victims and of members of the NKVD themselves. Hundreds of mass graves resulting from such operations were later discovered throughout the Soviet Union. Evidence exists that the NKVD committed mass extrajudicial executions, guided by secret "plans". Those plans established the number and proportion of victims (officially "public enemies") in a given region (e.g., quotas for clergy, former nobles, etc., regardless of identity). The families of the repressed, including children, were also automatically repressed according to NKVD Order no. 00486 (1937).

Purges took place in a number of waves according to decisions of the Politburo of the Communist Party. Examples include the campaigns against engineers (Shakhty Trial of May 1928), against party and military élites (such as the Great Purge of 1936 to 1938 with Order 00447 of 1937), and against medical staff (the "Doctors' Plot" of 1951 to 1953). Gas vans were used in the Soviet Union during the Great Purge in the cities of Moscow, Ivanovo, and Omsk

A number of mass operations of the NKVD related to persecution of entire ethnic categories. For example, the Polish Operation of the NKVD in 1937–1938 resulted in the execution of 111,091 Poles. Whole populations of certain ethnicities were forcibly resettled. Foreigners living in the Soviet Union received particular attention. When disillusioned American citizens in the Soviet Union thronged the gates of the U.S. embassy in Moscow to plead for new U.S. passports to leave the USSR during the Great Purge (their original U.S. passports had been taken for 'registration' purposes years before), none were issued. Instead, the NKVD promptly arrested the Americans, who were all taken to Lubyanka Prison and later shot. American factory workers at the Soviet Ford GAZ plant, suspected by Stalin of being 'poisoned' by Western influences, were dragged off with the others to Lubyanka by the NKVD in the very same Ford Model A cars they had helped build, where they were tortured; nearly all were executed or died in labor camps. Many of the slain Americans were dumped in the mass grave at Yuzhnoye Butovo District, near Moscow. However, the people of the Soviet Republics constituted the majority of NKVD victims.

=== International operations ===
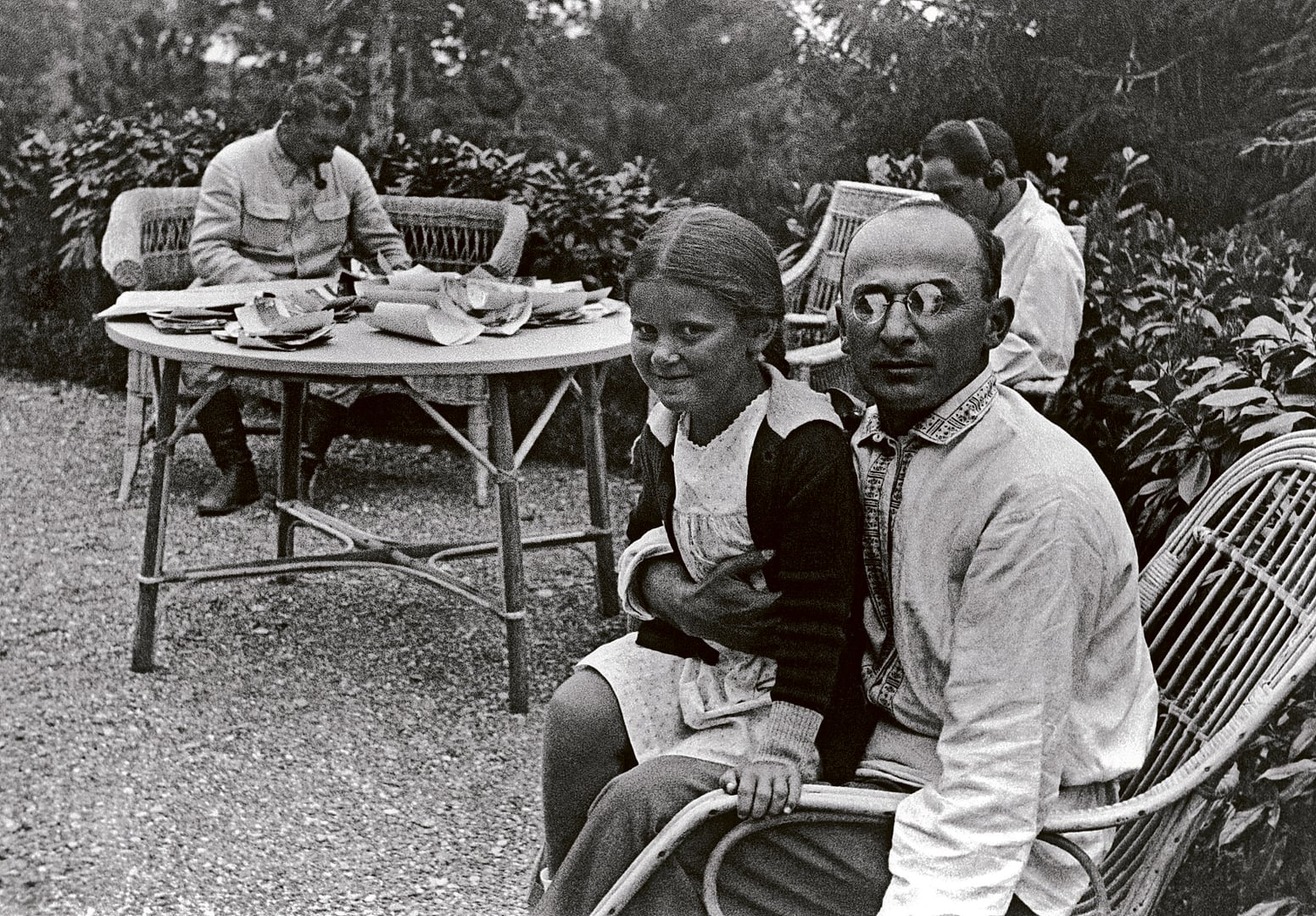
Lavrentiy Beria with Joseph Stalin (in background) and Stalin's daughter Svetlana

During the 1930s, the NKVD was responsible for political murders of those Stalin believed opposed him. Espionage networks headed by experienced multilingual NKVD officers such as Pavel Sudoplatov and Iskhak Akhmerov were established in nearly every major Western country, including the United States. The NKVD recruited agents for its espionage efforts from all walks of life, from unemployed intellectuals such as Mark Zborowski to aristocrats such as Martha Dodd. Besides the gathering of intelligence, these networks provided organizational assistance for so-called wet business, where enemies of the USSR either disappeared or were openly liquidated.

The NKVD's intelligence and special operations (Inostranny Otdel) unit organized overseas assassinations of political enemies of the USSR, such as leaders of nationalist movements, former Tsarist officials, and personal rivals of Joseph Stalin. Among the officially confirmed victims of such plots were:

- Leon Trotsky, a personal political enemy of Stalin and his most bitter international critic, killed in Mexico City in 1940.
- Yevhen Konovalets, a prominent Ukrainian nationalist leader attempting to create a separatist movement in Soviet Ukraine; assassinated in Rotterdam.
- Yevgeny Miller, former General of the Tsarist (Imperial Russian) Army; in the 1930s, he was responsible for funding anti-communist movements inside the USSR with the support of European governments. Kidnapped in Paris and brought to Moscow, where he was interrogated and executed.
- Noe Ramishvili, Prime Minister of independent Georgia, fled to France after the Bolshevik takeover; responsible for funding and coordinating Georgian nationalist organizations and the August uprising, he was assassinated in Paris.
- Boris Savinkov, a Russian revolutionary and anti-Bolshevik terrorist lured back into Russia and allegedly killed in 1924 by the Trust Operation of the GPU.
- Sidney Reilly, a British agent of MI6, deliberately entered Russia in 1925, trying to expose the Trust Operation to avenge Savinkov's death.
- Alexander Kutepov, former General of the Tsarist (Imperial Russian) Army, was active in organizing anti-communist groups with the support of French and British governments.

Prominent political dissidents were also found dead under highly suspicious circumstances, including Walter Krivitsky, Lev Sedov, Ignace Reiss, and former German Communist Party (KPD) member Willi Münzenberg.

Pro-Soviet leader Sheng Shicai in Xinjiang received NKVD assistance to conduct a purge coinciding with Stalin's Great Purge in 1937. Sheng and the Soviets alleged a massive Trotskyist conspiracy and a "Fascist Trotskyite plot" to destroy the Soviet Union. Soviet Consul General Garegin Apresoff, General Ma Hushan, Ma Shaowu, Mahmud Sijan, the official leader of Xinjiang province, Huang Han-chang, and Hoja-Niyaz were among the 435 alleged conspirators in the plot. Xinjiang came under Soviet influence.

=== Spanish Civil War ===
In the Spanish Civil War, the NKVD ran Section X, coordinating the Soviet intervention on behalf of the Spanish Republicans. NKVD agents acting in conjunction with the Communist Party of Spain exercised substantial control over the Republican government, using Soviet military aid to further Soviet influence. The NKVD established numerous secret prisons around Madrid, used to detain, torture, and kill hundreds of the NKVD's enemies, first focusing on Spanish Nationalists and Spanish Catholics, then after late 1938 increasingly anarchists and Trotskyists as objects of persecution. In 1937, Andrés Nin, the secretary of the Trotskyist POUM, and his colleagues were tortured and killed in an NKVD prison in Alcalá de Henares.

=== World War II operations ===
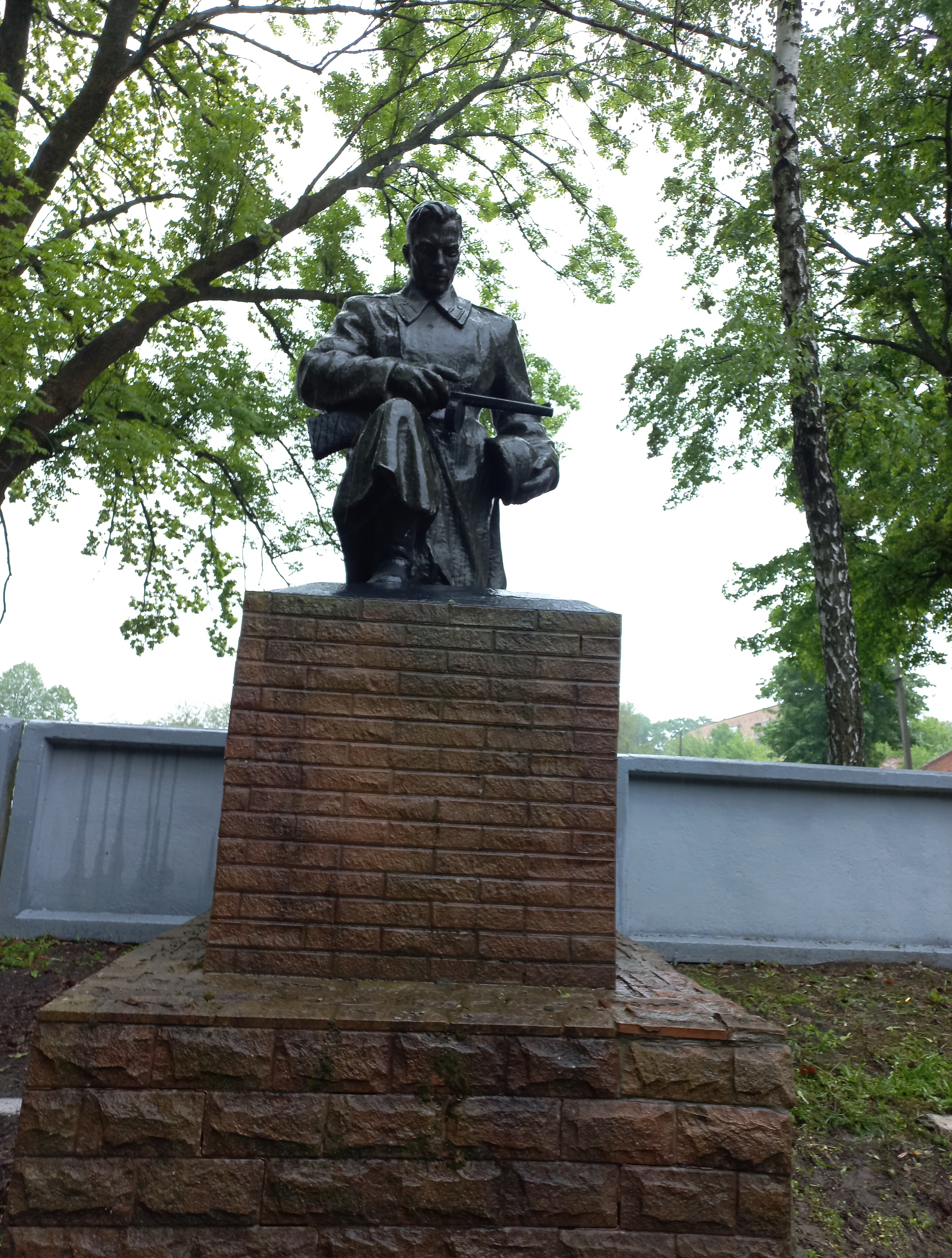
Memorial to the NKVD employee in the city of Znamianka

Before the German invasion, to accomplish its own goals, the NKVD was prepared to cooperate even with such organizations as the German Gestapo. In March 1940, representatives of the NKVD and the Gestapo met for a week in Zakopane to coordinate the pacification of Poland. The Soviet Union allegedly deported hundreds of German and Austrian Communists to Nazi territories as unwanted foreigners. According to the work of Wilhelm Mensing, no evidence that which suggests that the Soviets specifically targeted German and Austrian Communists or others who perceived themselves as "anti-fascists" for deportations to Nazi Germany. Furthermore, many NKVD units later fought the Wehrmacht, for example the 10th NKVD Rifle Division, which fought at the Battle of Stalingrad.

After the German invasion, the NKVD evacuated and killed prisoners. During World War II, NKVD Internal Troops were used for rear area security, including preventing the retreat of Soviet army divisions. Though mainly intended for internal security, NKVD divisions were sometimes used at the front, for example during the Battle of Stalingrad and the Crimean offensive. to stem desertions under Stalin's Order No. 270 and Order No. 227 decrees of 1941 and 1942, which aimed to raise troop morale through brutality and coercion. At the beginning of the war, the NKVD formed 15 rifle divisions, which grew by 1945 to 53 divisions and 28 brigades. Unlike the Waffen-SS, the NKVD did not field any armored or mechanized units.

In enemy-held territories, the NKVD carried out numerous missions of sabotage. After the fall of Kiev, NKVD agents set fire to the Nazi headquarters and various other targets, eventually burning down much of the city center. Similar actions took place across the occupied Byelorussia and Ukraine.

The NKVD (later the KGB) carried out mass arrests, deportations, and executions. The targets included both collaborators with Germany and members of non-communist resistance movements such as the Polish Home Army and the Ukrainian Insurgent Army, which were trying to separate from the Soviet Union, among others. The NKVD also executed tens of thousands of Polish political prisoners in 1940–1941, including at the Katyń massacre where chief NKVD executioner Vasily Blokhin personally oversaw and carried out thousands of the executions. On November 26, 2010, the State Duma issued a declaration acknowledging Stalin's responsibility for the Katyn massacre and the execution of intellectual leaders and 22,000 Polish POWs by Stalin's NKVD. The declaration stated that archival material "not only unveils the scale of his horrific tragedy but also provides evidence that the Katyn crime was committed on direct orders from Stalin and other Soviet leaders."

NKVD units were also used to repress the prolonged partisan war in Ukraine and the Baltics, which lasted until the early 1950s. NKVD also faced strong opposition in Poland from the Polish resistance movement known as the Armia Krajowa.

=== Postwar operations ===
After the death of Joseph Stalin in 1953, the new Soviet leader Nikita Khrushchev halted NKVD purges. From the 1950s to the 1980s, thousands of victims were legally "rehabilitated," i.e., acquitted with their rights restored. Many of the victims and their relatives refused to apply for rehabilitation, either out of fear or a lack of documents. The rehabilitation was not complete; in most cases, the formulation was "due to lack of evidence of the case of crime." Only a limited number of persons were rehabilitated with the formulation "cleared of all charges.".

Very few NKVD agents were ever officially convicted of a particular violation of anyone's rights. Legally, those agents executed in the 1930s were also "purged" without a legitimate criminal investigation or court decision. In the 1990s and 2000s, a small number of ex-NKVD agents in the Baltic states were convicted of crimes against the local population.

=== Intelligence activities ===
These included:

- Establishment of a widespread spy network through the Comintern.
- Operations of Richard Sorge, the "Red Orchestra," Willi Lehmann, and other agents who provided valuable intelligence during World War II.
- Recruitment of important UK officials as agents in the 1940s.
- Penetration of British intelligence (MI6) and counterintelligence (MI5) services.
- Collection of detailed nuclear weapons design information from the U.S. and Britain during the Manhattan Project.
- Disruption of several confirmed plots to assassinate Stalin.
- Establishment of the People's Republic of Poland and earlier its communist party along with training activists during World War II. The first President of Poland after the war was Bolesław Bierut, an NKVD agent.

=== Soviet economy ===
The extensive system of labor exploitation in the Gulag made a notable contribution to the rising Soviet economy and the development of remote areas. Colonization of Siberia, the Far North, and the Far East were among the explicitly stated goals in the first laws concerning Soviet labor camps. Mining, construction works (roads, railways, canals, dams, and factories), logging, and other functions of the labor camps were part of the Soviet planned economy, and the NKVD had its own production plans.

The most unusual part of the NKVD's achievements was its role in Soviet science and arms development. Many scientists and engineers arrested for political crimes were placed in special prisons, much more comfortable than the gulag, colloquially known as sharashkas. These prisoners continued their work in these prisons and were later released. Some of them became world leaders in science and technology. Among the sharashka were Sergey Korolev, head designer of the Soviet rocket program and first human space flight mission in 1961, and Andrei Tupolev, the famous airplane designer. Aleksandr Solzhenitsyn was also imprisoned in a sharashka and based his novel The First Circle on his experiences there.

After World War II, the NKVD coordinated work on Soviet nuclear weaponry under the direction of General Pavel Sudoplatov. The scientists were not prisoners, but the project was supervised by the NKVD because of its great importance and the corresponding requirement for absolute security and secrecy. The project also used information obtained by the NKVD from the United States.

== People's Commissars ==
The agency was headed by a people's commissar (minister). His first deputy was the director of State Security Service (GUGB).

- 1934–1936 Genrikh Yagoda, both people's commissar of Interior and director of State Security
- 1936–1938 Nikolai Yezhov, people's commissar of Interior
  - 1936–1937 Yakov Agranov, director of State Security (as the first deputy)
  - 1937–1938 Mikhail Frinovsky, director of State Security (as the first deputy)
  - 1938 Lavrentiy Beria, director of State Security (as the first deputy)
- 1938–1945 Lavrentiy Beria, people's commissar of Interior
  - 1938–1941 Vsevolod Merkulov, director of State Security (as the first deputy)
  - 1941–1943 Vsevolod Merkulov, director of State Security (as the first deputy)
- 1945–1946 Sergei Kruglov, people's commissar of Interior

Note: In the first half of 1941 Vsevolod Merkulov transformed his agency into separate commissariat (ministry), but it was merged back to the people's commissariat of Interior soon after the Nazi invasion of the Soviet Union. In 1943 Merkulov once again split his agency this time for good.

== Officers ==
Andrei Zhukov singlehandedly identified every single NKVD officer involved in 1930s arrests and killings by researching a Moscow archive. There are just over 40,000 names on the list.

== See also ==
- Bibliography of Stalinism and the Soviet Union § Terror, famine and the Gulag
- Poison laboratory of the Soviet secret services
- 10th NKVD Rifle Division
- Hitler Youth conspiracy, an NKVD case pursued in 1938
- NKVD filtration camps
- NKVD special camps in Germany 1945–1950, internment camps set up at the end of World War II in eastern Germany (often in former Nazi POW or concentration camps) and other areas under Soviet domination, to imprison those suspected of collaboration with the Nazis, or others deemed to be troublesome to Soviet ambitions.
