= 10th NKVD Rifle Division =

10th Rifle Division VV NKVD
- Active: 1 February 1942 – 5 February 1943
- Country: Soviet Union
- Branch: Internal Troops of the People's Commissariat of Internal Affairs
- Type: Infantry
- Size: 7568 men in February 1942; approximately 200 men in October 1942
- Part of: 62nd Army; Stalingrad Front
- Garrison/HQ: Stalingrad, Chelyabinsk
- Nickname(s): Stalingradskaya
- Engagements: World War II: Stalingrad
- Decorations: Order of Lenin

Commanders
- Notable commanders: Alexander Andreyevich Sarayev

The 10th Rifle Division 'Stalingrad' of the Order of Lenin of the Internal Troops of the NKVD of the USSR (Russian: 10-я стрелковая Сталинградская ордена Ленина дивизия внутренних войск НКВД СССР) was a Soviet rifle division formed on 1 February 1942 prior to the Battle of Stalingrad. The 10th Rifle Division participated in heavy front-line actions which would significantly reduce its strength by the battle's end. It was under the jurisdiction of the Internal Troops of the NKVD but took strategic orders from the 62nd Army command. Later it converted into a regular Red Army division and was renamed the 181st "Order of Lenin" "Stalingrad" Rifle Division.

== Brief timeline ==
- 1 February 1942 - Division was formed by the GKO Order no. 1099: "Concerning the organization of the garrison troops of the NKVD in the cities, and Red Army liberation" and the order of the NKVD no. 0021
- November 1942 - By order of the NKVD no. 002356, it was renamed and reorganized into 'Stalingrad' Rifle Division of the NKVD according to the staff of the NKO
- 5 December 1942 - Renamed the 10th Rifle Division 'Stalingrad' 'Order of Lenin' of the troops of the NKVD
- 5 February 1943 - Transferred to the Red Army and renamed the 181st 'Stalingrad' of the Order of Lenin Rifle Division

== History ==
=== Formation of the division ===
In early 1942, the Oblast Committee (Obkom) of the Party and the City Committee of Defense were instructed that Stalingrad would form a division. Later, this division had the grievous task of being one of the first to enter the unequal battle against the German forces breaking through to Stalingrad. The terms of formation and composition of the division were determined by a special resolution from the GKO. Units of the 10th NKVD, commanded by Colonel Alexander A. Sarayev, arrived in Stalingrad in January 1942. Major Vasiliy Ivanovich Zaytsev was appointed Chief of Staff of the Division. The core of the division were soldiers and commanders of the Border Troops from Ural and Siberian regions including Sverdlovsk, Irkutsk, and Novosibirsk, but the nuclei of the 269th and 270th regiments were citizens of Stalingrad, Party workers, and members of the Komsomol organizations of the city. Roughly three thousand Stalingrad locals served in the division.

=== Operational activities prior to the Battle of Stalingrad ===
The division performed the tasks of policing in Stalingrad, and in the surrounding Oblast, in Voronezh, in the rears of the Southwestern Front, the Voronezh Front, and Stalingrad Front; enforcing martial law; and the task of preventing enemy recon and saboteur groups from operating in these rear areas.

- 29 January – 3 July 1942 - 41st Rifle Regiment protected law and order in and around Voronezh.
- 17–22 March 1942 - The division at Stalingrad conducted a documentation screening operation of the city's population and successfully detained nine spies, 106 criminals, and 187 people with variously suspicious documents.
- Sometime in June, 1942 - 273rd Rifle Regiment near the village of Novoaninsky destroyed a landing of Germans (Brandenburgers) armed with Soviet weapons and equipment disguised as Red Army soldiers, killing 47 of them and capturing 2.
- 3–31 July 1942 - 41st Rifle Regiment took part in the defense of Voronezh, the first of the regiments of the division to take part in the frontline fighting during this period. The regiment killed up to 1,500 Germans and captured 17 machine guns, 42 machine pistols, 730 rifles, 415 grenades, 17,000 rounds of ammunition. The regiment suffered a loss of one third of its personnel in killed, wounded and missing.
- 12 July 1942 - The division is included in the active Army
- 13–27 July 1942 - In the defense of the rear of the Stalingrad Front, the division arrested 15 spies and 2,775 people (Brandenburgers) found without valid documents.

Sometime in July 1942 - The division formed an auxiliary artillery battalion.

- August 1942 - 41st Rifle Regiment was detached from the division and assigned to the 18th Independent Sappers Brigade of the NKVD Internal Troops.

=== Fighting in the Battle of Stalingrad ===
The division, alongside the people's militias, received the first blow of the Germans penetrating towards the Volga in the summer of 1942. Worker's militias were not just employed here in reconnaissance, but were deployed to catch enemy parachutists, spies, and saboteurs.

In appreciation of the division's defense of the city, the commander of the 62nd Army Vasiliy Chuykov said: "The fighters of Colonel Sarayev's 10th Stalingrad Division VV must have been the first defenders of Stalingrad, and they overcame the difficult challenge with flying colours, courageously and selflessly fighting against superior enemy forces until the arrival of the 62nd Army."

The division, stretched over 80 kilometres (50 mi), led many fierce battles against the Germans. In the early stages of the battle for the city, the divisional HQ was billeted in the Tsarina gulley, not far from the "Lighthouse" restaurant.

The 10th Division, with a battalion of industrial workers, successfully defended the F. Dzerzhinsky Tractor Factory and later counter-attacked to regain several kilometres, despite shortages in technology and manpower.

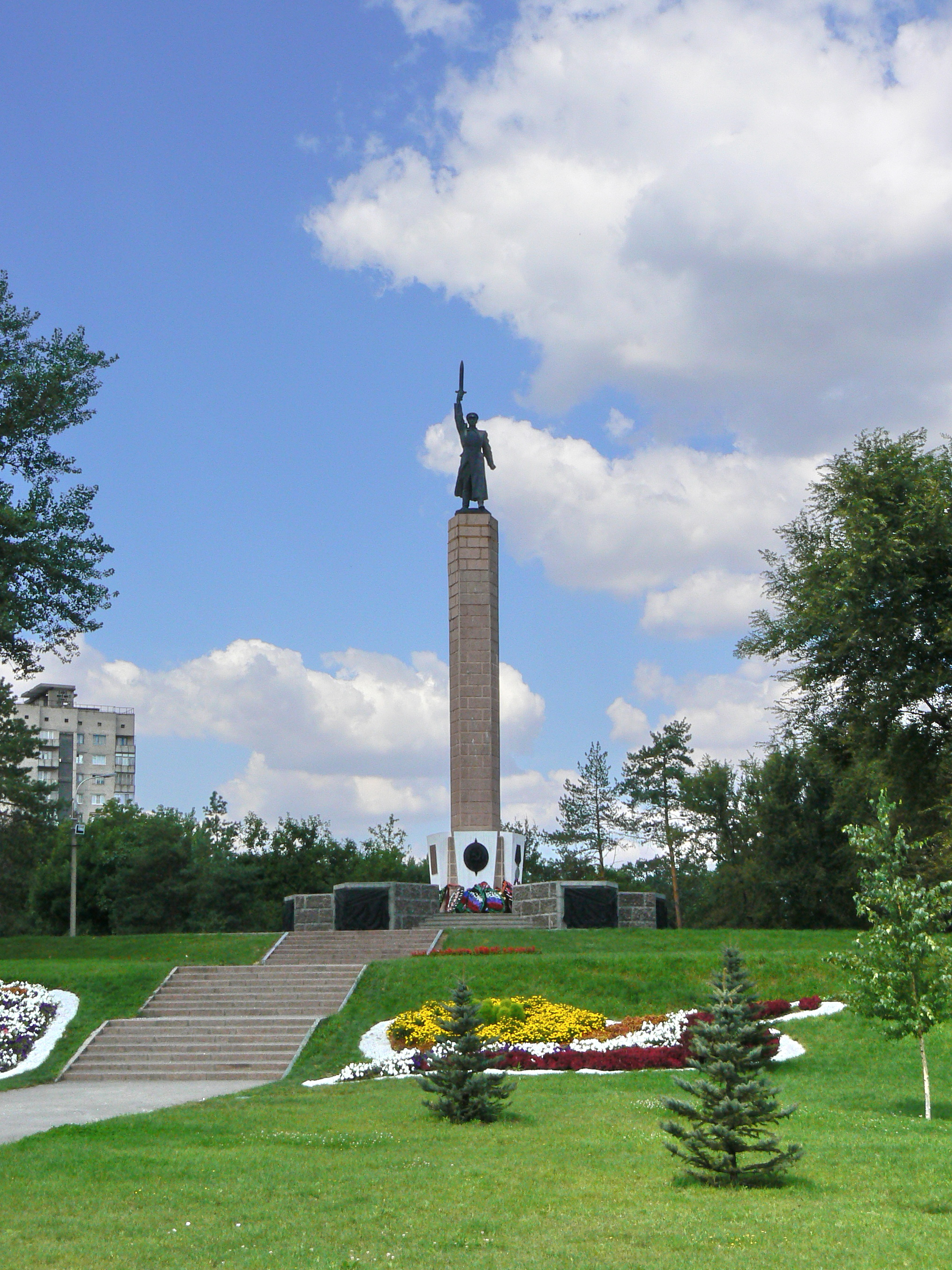
Obelisk dedicated to the soldiers of the 10th NKVD in "Chekist Square" in Volgograd

On 2 August 1942, the 2nd Battalion of the 270th Rifle Regiment first engaged the Germans in Stalingrad.

On 14 August 1942, the 273rd Rifle Regiment detached from the division and joined the 12th "Ordzhonikidzevskaya" Rifle Division of the NKVD VV.

The bulk of the division's forces defended the west and south-west of the city, holding these areas against the sudden breakout of the enemy into the city. In addition to this, there was a consolidated battalion in the north. On 16 August, the 282nd Rifle Regiment of the 12th NKVD VV Rifle Division arrived from Saratov and was attached to the 10th. This regiment was immediately sent to the north to reinforcement the composite battalion. On the left bank of the Volga, the division was supported by several reserve regiments from High Command.

The 272nd Rifle Regiment, under command of G. P. Savchuk, and a group of student volunteers occupied a Military-Political Academy in the path of an impending enemy breakthrough. During five days of fierce fighting, the regiment denied elements of the 295th Infantry, 71st Infantry and 24th Panzer Divisions (all belonging to the LI Armeekorps). These enemy forces suffered heavy losses and the Germans' plan to capture the center of the city and the major crossing of the Volga was thwarted.

On 8 September began fighting for the southern part of the Voroshilov district. By mid-afternoon of 9 September, forward units of the NKVD, who were on the second line, had come under direct enemy attack. The Soviets launched a swift counterattack and the Germans were caught by surprise.

On 12 September, the fighting for the defense of the South-Eastern Front of Stalingrad was assigned to the 62nd Army, to which the 10th NKVD VV Division was now attached.

On 13 September, the enemy planned another assault on the city. In the morning they hit Soviet fortified positions, including those of the 269th Rifle Regiment of the 10th NKVD, with heavy artillery and mortar fire. Aviation groups of up to 40 aircraft bombed areas in the Russian rear. At 7:00, the offensive began. For three hours, elements of the 62nd Army repelled enemy attacks which penetrated the first line, knocked out forward posts, and reached the positions of the 269th Rifle Regiment. In this difficult and hazardous situation, the 269th held their area, blocking the path to the Hill 102.0 Mamayev Kurgan. In the center of this fighting was the 270th Rifle Regiment under the command of Major A.K. Zhuravlev. Despite their numerical superiority, the enemy did not successfully enter the center of Stalingrad on 13 September.

The next day began again with German air and artillery bombardments in preparation for an attack. The entire Soviet front from Mamayev Kurgan to Kuporosnoye suffered German shock-attacks. Following these, the entire German front advanced with large-scale infantry and armour formations. Against the 269th Rifle Regiment alone the Germans concentrated up to eight battalions and 50 tanks. At 1400 hours, two submachine gun battalions with three tanks penetrated the regiment's rear and captured the peak of Mamayev Kurgan. The Germans then began firing on the "Red October" factory. To recapture the peak, a submachine gun company of the 269th, under command of Junior Lieutenant Lyubeznov, and the 416th Rifle Regiment of the 112th Rifle Division with two tanks launched a counterattack. By 1800 hours, the height has been cleared out.

Over the two days of fighting, the 269th Rifle Regiment killed and wounded more than a thousand soldiers and officers and disabled 20 enemy tanks.

On the night of 15 September, the enemy infiltrated the positions of the NKVD and specialists, captured the train-station and reached the rear of the 262nd regiment and 1st battalion of the 270th regiment. Nothing was prepared to repel such an infiltration and bloody, desperate fighting ensued from Mamayev to Kuporosnoye.

At dawn on 16 September, four soldiers of the division waged an unequal battle against advancing tanks for several hours. They destroyed a total of 20 vehicles and were all posthumously awarded with high state honours.

Together with elements of the 10th NKVD's northern groups, the 62nd Army conducted bitter defensive operations all through September and regained ground in some areas. On 7 October, surviving soldiers of the regiment were consolidated into two companies and which were added to the consolidated battalion under the command of the Captain Ryabchevskiy. Every day they fought off several fierce attacks from the enemy, preventing him from breaking through to the tractor plant.

From August 1942 onward, from the elements of the 10th NKVD remained the 282nd Infantry Regiment, defending the height of 135.4.

Between 23 August – 8 October 1942 during the battle of Stalingrad, the division killed or wounded up to 15,000 German soldiers and officers, destroyed or disabled 113 tanks, 8 armored vehicles, destroyed or captured 6 guns, 51 mortars, 138 machine guns, two ammunition depots, 2 aircraft shot down, and seized a German regiment's banner.

For exemplary service in the combat operations in the defense of the Volga shores, the Soviet High Command awarded the 10th NKVD VV Division with the Order of Lenin on 2 December 1942.

=== Further history ===
Divisional losses were heavy. By order of the commander of the Stalingrad Front, the division was demobilized in early October 1942 and moved to the village of Zaplavnoye. The division consisted of little more than 200 men of initial 7568.

In mid-October 1942, the division headquarters was ordered to redeploy to the city of Chelyabinsk to reorganize. The division took on a new structure:

- Three Rifle Regiments
- One Artillery Regiment
- One Auxiliary Anti-Tank Battalion
- Various support and logistical units

The core of the newly organized unit was approximately 2,700 men and officers who were veterans of the battle of Stalingrad. The battle of Stalingrad ended on 2 February 1943, and on 5 February the division was renamed the 181st Rifle Division and transferred to regular Red Army command. Subsequently, the fighting experience and techniques of the men of "Stalingradskaya" were further developed in the battle of Kursk in the crossing of the Vistula river. The division saw the close of the war while in Breslau.

== Order of battle ==
Unit	Commander	Political Officer	Note
41st Infantry Regiment	Major; D. M. Vasilchenko		transferred to the 18th Independent Sappers Brigade in August 1942
269th Rifle Regiment	Lt. Colonel; I. I. Kapranov		
270th Rifle Regiment	Major; A. K. Zhuravlev		
271st Rifle Regiment	Major; A. P. Kostenitsyn		
272nd Rifle Regiment	Major; G. P. Savchuk		
273rd Rifle Regiment	Major; F. N. Morozov		transferred to the "Ordzhonikidzevskaya" Rifle Division of the NKVD VV on 14 August 1942
282nd Rifle Regiment	Major; M. S. Glushchenko	A. M. Karpov	joined the division on 16 August 1942 after transferring from 12th NKVD VV Division.
Artillery battalion			
Separate combat security company	Lieutenant; Oleynik		
Separate motor-rifle company			

The commander Sarayev wrote thus about the division:

Our 10th Division was formed in early 1942. It is composed of:

- The 271st Rifle Regiment. It is mostly composed of the sons of Ural metallurgists and mechanical engineers, they were characterized by a high class- and political-consciousness.
- The 272nd Rifle Regiment. It included mostly Siberians, youth, so the regiment was known as the "Komsomolskiy". The boldness of youth and enthusiasm in combat - that's what distinguished this regiment in subsequent battles.
- The 282nd Rifle Regiment. Its men came almost exclusively from Volzhan. They, like the others, showed fortitude and courage in battle.
- The 269th and 270th Rifle Regiments were formed in Stalingrad, mainly from local residents. They fought valiantly for their hometown.

== Strength ==
On 23 August 1942—7568 men

== Personnel ==
=== Command staff ===
- Commander - Colonel Aleksandr Andreyevich Sarayev (1 February 1942 – 5 February 1943)
- Military Commissar - Regimental Commissar Pyotr Nikiforovich Kuznetsov
- Drillmaster/Training Officer - Colonel Nikolay Stepanovich Vasin
- Chief of Staff - Lieutenant-Colonel Vasiliy Ivanovich Zaytsev
- Chief of Department Operations - Lieutenant-Colonel M. K. Khitrov

=== Distinguished soldiers and junior officers ===
- 268 men received high government awards:
  - F. Ivanov, Lieutenant - Head of a sniper team that killed 39 Germans, Recipient (Chevalier) of the Order of the Red Banner
  - M. Klyushnik - a sniper that killed 43 Germans, Recipient of the Order of the Red Banner
  - Nikolai Smirnov, Lieutenant - A commander of a recon platoon of the 271st Regiment of the 181st Division, Recipient of the Order of Red Banner
- 20 members of the division were awarded the title Hero of the Soviet Union, 9 of them prior to Victory Day:
  - Alexey Prokhorovich Voloshin, Hero of the Soviet Union
- 5 people became holders of the Order of Glory of all three classes.

== Regimental awards ==
- 2 December 1942 - awarded the Order of Lenin.
- 2 December 1942 - bestowed the honorary title of 'Stalingradskaya'.

== Memorials ==
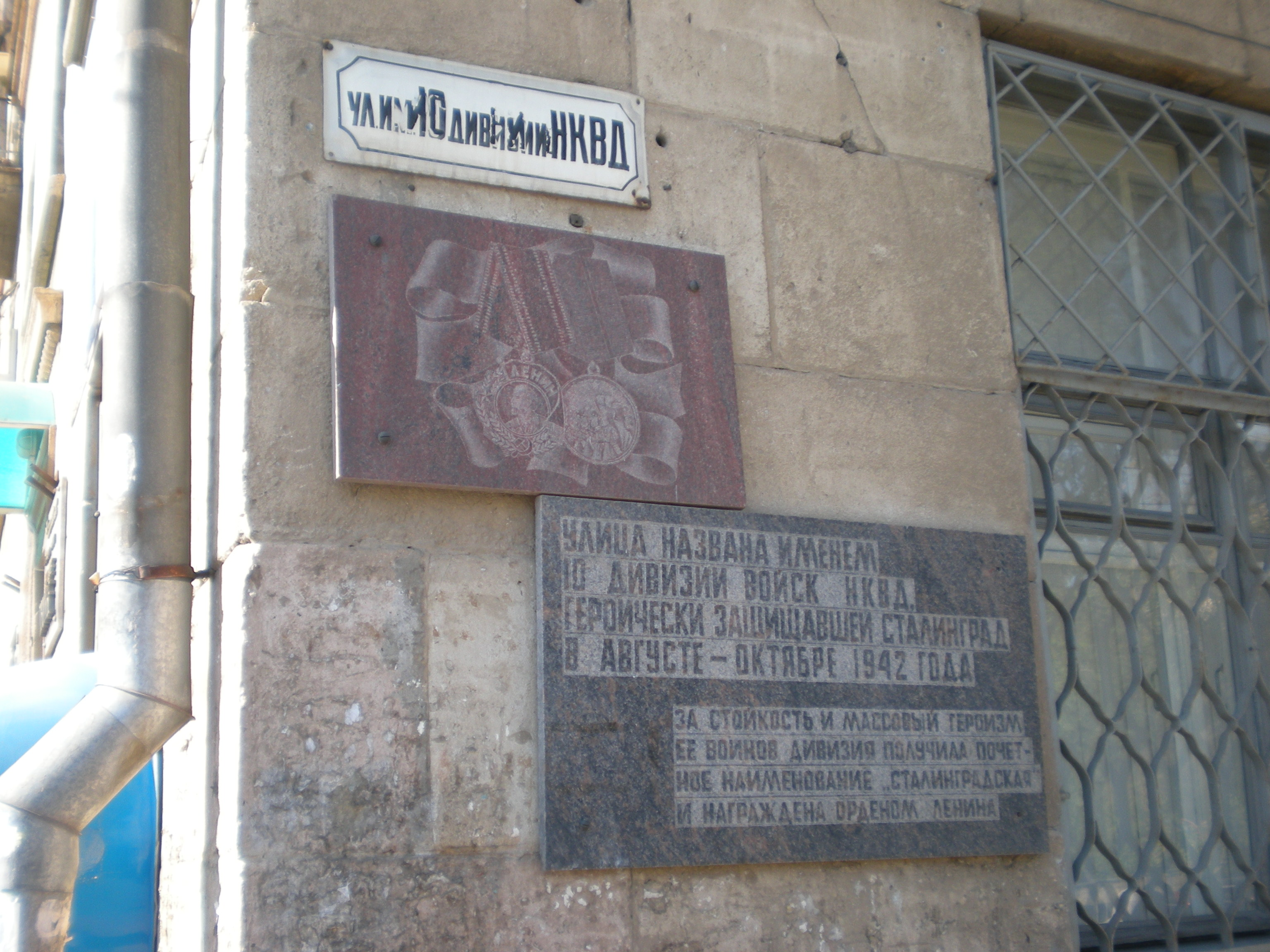
"10th Division of the NKVD" Street in Volgograd

- The 'Chekist Square' monument to the 10th NKVD VV Division and the militiamen of Stalingrad in Volgograd.
- A street in the Central District of Volgograd is named after the division.
- Eight other streets are named after individual soldiers whom served in the division.
