= VOKhR =

Internal Security Forces of the Republic (VOKhR)
- Войска внутренней охраны республики (ВОХР)
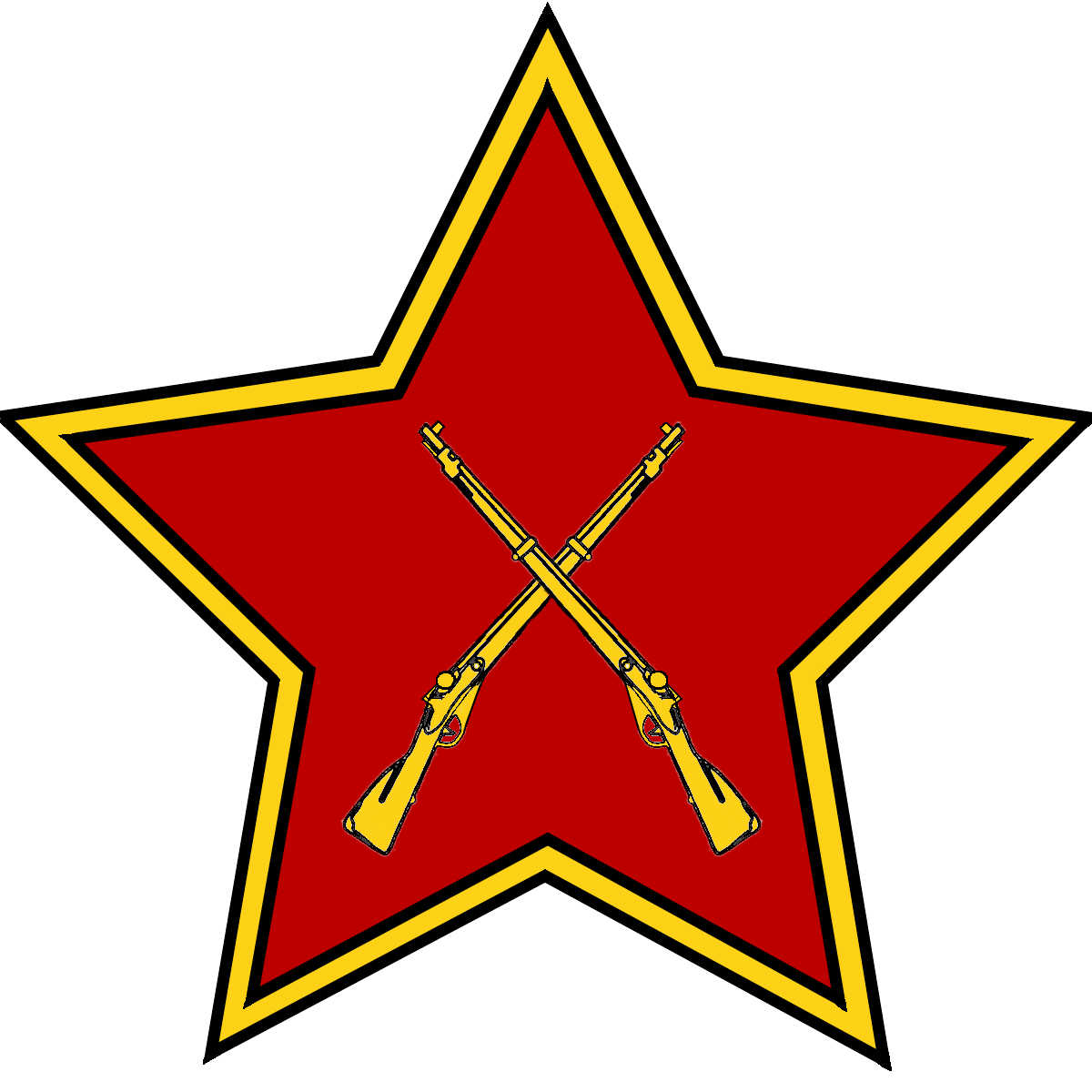
- Official and main symbol of the VOKhR paramilitary which depicts a red star with two crossed rifles.
- Active: December 1917 - 1921
- Country: Russian SFSR
- Branch: Cheka
- Role: Internal security
- Nickname: VeCheka
- Engagements: Russian Civil War Tambov Rebellion

Insignia
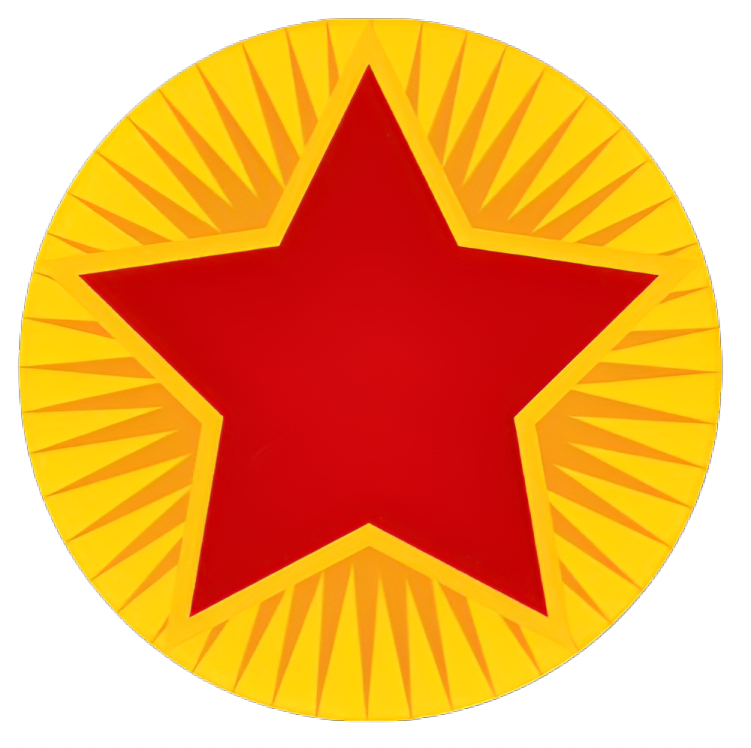
- Identification symbol

The Internal Security Forces of the Republic (VOKhR; Russian: Войска внутренней охраны республики, ВОХР) was a paramilitary organisation of the Cheka from 1917 to 1921. It was responsible for internal security, protecting communications and transportation, and guarding the borders and regions of the Russian Soviet Federative Socialist Republic during the Russian Civil War. VOKhR was disbanded and its troops were split between the Cheka and the Red Army.

== History ==
Following the October Revolution in November 1917, the Bolsheviks established the Russian Soviet Federative Socialist Republic (RSFSR) and triggered the Russian Civil War as the White Army, along with many minorities and republics, declared war on each other in the midst of the chaos. In December, the Council of People's Commissars created the Cheka as the RSFSR was faced with numerous external and internal security threats. The Internal Security Forces of the Republic (VOKhR) was developed from various armed and unarmed Bolshevik guard units, along with the larger secret police force of the Cheka, to provide internal security to the undeveloped countryside of Russia. The VOKhR was largely designed to be operated by both officials, extensively trained personnel from the Cheka, other internal security branches, and civilians who volunteered or were conscripted. Civilians were more needed because they could report, guard or operate in smaller communities and roads across the countryside that were not easily reachable. As the Russian Civil War turned in favour of the Bolsheviks, there was a growing need for a rearguard force for the progressing Red Army.

The VOKhR was formally established by the Resolution of the Council of Workers' and Peasants' Defense of the RSFSR dated 28 May 1919. According to this document, all disparate armed security formations of various departments (protection of communication routes under the People's Commissariat of Railways, protection of waterways under the Supreme Soviet of the National Economy, requisition and food detachments of the People's Commissariat of Food, troops of the Main Directorate of Sugar, Main Directorate of Oil, Center Textiles and many others) from 1 July 1919 were transferred to the complete subordination of the Cheka through the Headquarters of the Internal Security Troops. On 21 July 1919, the headquarters and structure were approved: all the motley formations were reorganized into battalions, regiments and brigades, and the entire territory of the RSFSR was divided into 11 VOKhR sectors. K. M. Volobuyev was approved as its first chief. By the Resolution of the Council of Workers' and Peasants' Defense of 1 September 1920, the VOKhR were included in the Internal Service Troops, the internal security troops of the RSFSR, as independent escort and guard units. In fact, the VOKhR were part of the VNUS, which was assigned security functions.

By mid-1920, the VOKhR exceeded 240,000 people, but with likely Bolshevik victory in the Russian Civil War, its internal security function were less important and its troops were mainly assigned to guarding detention camps. In January 1921, the VOKhR was disbanded: some of the troops were transferred to the direct control of the Cheka and became known as the VKhK troops (responsible for combating banditry and protecting communication routes), the remaining troops were transferred to the Red Army and, for the most part, were soon disbanded.
