= Domestic security =

Maintenance of peace within a state

Domestic security is the act of keeping peace within the borders of a sovereign state or other self-governing territories, generally by upholding the national law and defending against internal security threats. This task and role differ from border security. Responsibility for internal security may range from police to paramilitary forces, and in exceptional circumstances, the military itself.

== Threats to domestic security ==
Defining what exactly constitutes a domestic threat is often contingent on political, cultural, and generational contexts.

Threats to the general peace may range from minor civil unrest, large scale violence, or even an armed insurgency. Threats to internal security may be directed at either the state's citizens, or the organs and infrastructure of the state itself, and may range from petty crime, serious organized crime, political or industrial unrest, or even domestic terrorism. Foreign powers may also act as a threat to internal security, by either committing or sponsoring terrorism or rebellion, without actually declaring war.

Governmental responsibility for internal security will generally rest with an interior ministry, as opposed to a defence ministry. Depending on the state, a state's internal security will be maintained by either the ordinary police or more militarised security forces (known as gendarmerie or, literally, the internal troops). Other specialized internal security agencies may exist to augment these main forces, such as border guards, police tactical units, or aspects of the state's intelligence agencies. In some states, internal security may be the primary responsibility of a secret police force.

The level of authorized force used by agencies and forces responsible for maintaining internal security might range from unarmed police to fully armed paramilitary organizations, or employ some level of less-lethal weaponry in between. For violent situations, internal security forces may contain some element of military type equipment such as non-military armored vehicles.

== Justice aspects ==
Depending on the organization of the state, internal security forces may have jurisdiction on national or federal levels. As the concept of internal security refers to the entity of the state and its citizens, persons who are threats to internal security may be designated as an enemy of the state or enemy of the people.

Persons detained by internal security forces may either be dealt with by the normal criminal justice system, or for more serious crimes against internal security such as treason, they may face special measures such as secret trials. In times of extreme unrest, internal security actions may include measures such as internment (detention without trial).

== Relationship with the military ==
Depending on the nature of the specific state's form of government, enforcing internal security will generally not be carried out by a country's military forces, whose primary role is external defense, except in times of extreme unrest or other state of emergency, short of civil war. Often, military involvement in internal security is restricted to authorized military aid to the civil power as part of the principle of civilian control of the military. Military special forces units may in some cases be put under the temporary command of civilian powers, for special internal security situations such as counter terrorism operations.

== See also ==
- Homeland security
- National security
- Private security
- Public security
- McCarran Internal Security Act of 1950 (US)
