= Lebyazhy =

Lebyazhy (Russian: Лебя́жий; masculine), Lebyazhaya (Лебя́жья; feminine), or Lebyazhye (Лебя́жье; neuter) is the name of several inhabited localities in Russia.

== Altai Krai ==
As of 2010, five rural localities in Altai Krai bear this name:

- Lebyazhye, Barnaul, Altai Krai, a selo in Lebyazhinskaya Settlement Administration of the city of krai significance of Barnaul
- Lebyazhye, Krasnogorsky District, Altai Krai, a selo in Souskanikhinsky Selsoviet of Krasnogorsky District
- Lebyazhye, Pavlovsky District, Altai Krai, a selo in Lebyazhinsky Selsoviet of Pavlovsky District
- Lebyazhye, Pervomaysky District, Altai Krai, a selo in Severny Selsoviet of Pervomaysky District
- Lebyazhye, Yegoryevsky District, Altai Krai, a selo in Lebyazhinsky Selsoviet of Yegoryevsky District

== Amur Oblast ==
As of 2010, one rural locality in Amur Oblast bears this name:

- Lebyazhye, Amur Oblast, a selo in Lebyazhyevsky Rural Settlement of Seryshevsky District

== Astrakhan Oblast ==
As of 2010, two rural localities in Astrakhan Oblast bear this name:

- Lebyazhye, Kamyzyaksky District, Astrakhan Oblast, a selo in Lebyazhinsky Selsoviet of Kamyzyaksky District
- Lebyazhye, Volodarsky District, Astrakhan Oblast, a selo in Kalininsky Selsoviet of Volodarsky District

== Republic of Bashkortostan ==
As of 2010, one rural locality in the Republic of Bashkortostan bears this name:

- Lebyazhy, Republic of Bashkortostan, a selo in Zubovsky Selsoviet of Ufimsky District

== Chelyabinsk Oblast ==
As of 2010, one rural locality in Chelyabinsk Oblast bears this name:

- Lebyazhy, Chelyabinsk Oblast, a settlement in Knyazhensky Selsoviet of Bredinsky District

== Kemerovo Oblast ==
As of 2010, one rural locality in Kemerovo Oblast bears this name:

- Lebyazhy, Kemerovo Oblast, a settlement in Lebyazhya Rural Territory of Mariinsky District

== Kirov Oblast ==
As of 2010, one urban locality in Kirov Oblast bears this name:

- Lebyazhye, Kirov Oblast, an urban-type settlement in Lebyazhsky District

== Krasnodar Krai ==
As of 2010, one rural locality in Krasnodar Krai bears this name:

- Lebyazhy, Krasnodar Krai, a khutor under the administrative jurisdiction of the town of Gulkevichi, Gulkevichsky District

== Krasnoyarsk Krai ==
As of 2010, two rural localities in Krasnoyarsk Krai bear this name:

- Lebyazhye, Krasnoturansky District, Krasnoyarsk Krai, a selo in Lebyazhensky Selsoviet of Krasnoturansky District
- Lebyazhye, Nizhneingashsky District, Krasnoyarsk Krai, a settlement in Kanifolninsky Selsoviet of Nizhneingashsky District

== Kurgan Oblast ==
As of 2010, six inhabited localities in Kurgan Oblast bear this name:

Urban localities

- Lebyazhye, Lebyazhyevsky District, Kurgan Oblast, an urban-type settlement in Lebyazhyevsky District

Rural localities

- Lebyazhye, Belozersky District, Kurgan Oblast, a village in Yagodninsky Selsoviet of Belozersky District
- Lebyazhye, Chastoozersky District, Kurgan Oblast, a village in Sivkovsky Selsoviet of Chastoozersky District
- Lebyazhye, Dalmatovsky District, Kurgan Oblast, a selo in Lebyazhsky Selsoviet of Dalmatovsky District
- Lebyazhye, Kurtamyshsky District, Kurgan Oblast, a village in Pesyansky Selsoviet of Kurtamyshsky District
- Lebyazhye, Mishkinsky District, Kurgan Oblast, a village in Krasnoznamensky Selsoviet of Mishkinsky District

== Kursk Oblast ==
As of 2010, one rural locality in Kursk Oblast bears this name:

- Lebyazhye, Kursk Oblast, a selo in Lebyazhensky Selsoviet of Kursky District

== Leningrad Oblast ==
As of 2010, two inhabited localities in Leningrad Oblast bear this name:

Urban localities

- Lebyazhye, Lomonosovsky District, Leningrad Oblast, an urban-type settlement under the administrative jurisdiction of Lebyazhenskoye Settlement Municipal Formation of Lomonosovsky District

Rural localities

- Lebyazhye, Vyborgsky District, Leningrad Oblast, a logging depot settlement under the administrative jurisdiction of Roshchinskoye Settlement Municipal Formation of Vyborgsky District

== Lipetsk Oblast ==
As of 2010, two rural localities in Lipetsk Oblast bear this name:

- Lebyazhye, Dobrovsky District, Lipetsk Oblast, a selo in Bolshe-Khomutetsky Selsoviet of Dobrovsky District
- Lebyazhye, Izmalkovsky District, Lipetsk Oblast, a selo in Lebyazhensky Selsoviet of Izmalkovsky District

== Nizhny Novgorod Oblast ==
As of 2010, one rural locality in Nizhny Novgorod Oblast bears this name:

- Lebyazhye, Nizhny Novgorod Oblast, a village in Kantaurovsky Selsoviet of the Bor City of Oblast Significance

== Novosibirsk Oblast ==
As of 2010, two rural localities in Novosibirsk Oblast bear this name:

- Lebyazhye, Bolotninsky District, Novosibirsk Oblast, a village in Bolotninsky District
- Lebyazhye, Tatarsky District, Novosibirsk Oblast, a village in Tatarsky District

== Omsk Oblast ==
As of 2010, one rural locality in Omsk Oblast bears this name:

- Lebyazhye, Omsk Oblast, a village in Knyazevsky Rural Okrug of Nazyvayevsky District

== Orenburg Oblast ==
As of 2010, one rural locality in Orenburg Oblast bears this name:

- Lebyazhy, Orenburg Oblast, a settlement in Koltubansky Selsoviet of Buzuluksky District

== Oryol Oblast ==
As of 2010, one rural locality in Oryol Oblast bears this name:

- Lebyazhye, Oryol Oblast, a village in Kirovsky Selsoviet of Soskovsky District

== Samara Oblast ==
As of 2010, one rural locality in Samara Oblast bears this name:

- Lebyazhy, Samara Oblast, a settlement in Kinelsky District

== Sverdlovsk Oblast ==
As of 2010, three rural localities in Sverdlovsk Oblast bear this name:

- Lebyazhye, Kamensky District, Sverdlovsk Oblast, a settlement in Kamensky District
- Lebyazhye, Krasnoufimsky District, Sverdlovsk Oblast, a village in Krasnoufimsky District
- Lebyazhye, Tavdinsky District, Sverdlovsk Oblast, a settlement in Tavdinsky District

== Tambov Oblast ==
As of 2010, one rural locality in Tambov Oblast bears this name:

- Lebyazhye, Tambov Oblast, a selo in Nizhneshibryaysky Selsoviet of Uvarovsky District

== Republic of Tatarstan ==
As of 2010, one rural locality in the Republic of Tatarstan bears this name:

- Lebyazhye, Republic of Tatarstan, a selo in Alexeyevsky District

== Tula Oblast ==
As of 2010, one rural locality in Tula Oblast bears this name:

- Lebyazhye, Tula Oblast, a village in Panarinsky Rural Okrug of Volovsky District

== Tyumen Oblast ==
As of 2010, one rural locality in Tyumen Oblast bears this name:

- Lebyazhye, Tyumen Oblast, a village in Gotoputovsky Rural Okrug of Sorokinsky District

== Ulyanovsk Oblast ==
As of 2010, one rural locality in Ulyanovsk Oblast bears this name:

- Lebyazhye, Ulyanovsk Oblast, a selo in Lebyazhinsky Rural Okrug of Melekessky District

== Volgograd Oblast ==
As of 2010, two rural localities in Volgograd Oblast bear this name:

- Lebyazhy, Volgograd Oblast, a khutor in Kolovertinsky Selsoviet of Serafimovichsky District
- Lebyazhye, Volgograd Oblast, a selo in Lebyazhensky Selsoviet of Kamyshinsky District

== Voronezh Oblast ==
As of 2010, two rural localities in Voronezh Oblast bear this name:

- Lebyazhye, Nizhnedevitsky District, Voronezh Oblast, a selo in Sinelipyagovskoye Rural Settlement of Nizhnedevitsky District
- Lebyazhye, Ramonsky District, Voronezh Oblast, a selo in Pavlovskoye Rural Settlement of Ramonsky District

== See also ==
- Lebyazhye, Kazakhstan
- Lebyazhye District, Pavlodar Region, Kazakhstan
