= National Guard Naval Service Corps =

Naval branch of the Russian National Guard

Naval Service Corps of the National Guard Forces Command Морские части Войск национальной гвардии Российской Федерации Morskiye Chasti Voysk Natsional'noy Gvardii Rossiyskoy Federatsii
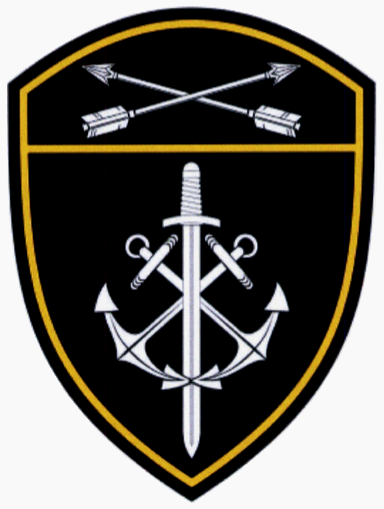
- Unit patch

- Naval ensign of Russian National Guard watercraft after 2019 Racing stripe of Russian National Guard watercraft
- Common name: Naval National Guard
- Motto: Честь, отвага, мужество Honor, Bravery, Courage

Agency overview
- Formed: 1978
- Preceding agency: Naval Service of the Internal Troops of Russia (raised 1978)
- Employees: estimated 5,000 active personnel
- Volunteers: estimated 8,000 reserves

Jurisdictional structure
- Federal agency (Operations jurisdiction): RUS
- Operations jurisdiction: RUS
- Population: 145 million
- Legal jurisdiction: Russian Federation
- Primary governing body: Security Council of Russia
- Secondary governing body: National Guard of Russia
- General nature: Federal law enforcement; Gendarmerie; Civilian police
- Specialist jurisdiction: Coastal patrol, marine border protection, marine search and rescue

Operational structure
- Overseen by: President of Russia through the Commander of the National Guard and the Commander of the NGFC
- Headquarters: Moscow
- Agency executives: General Viktor Zolotov, Commander, National Guard Forces; Captain 1st Rank Andrey Andreev, Commander of the NGNSC-NGFC
- Parent agency: Security Council of Russia through the National Guard of Russia
- Child agency: National Guard Naval Diving Service
- Services provided by: National Guard Forces Command
- Uniformed as: naval service personnel

Facilities
- Stations: 5 Naval Detachments and various naval service units within the NGFC

Notables
- Significant operation: Anti-terrorism operations, combating illegal weapons trade, keeping public order in the seas and inland waters of Russia, water police, coast guard and lifesaving activities
- Anniversary: April 5 March 27, anniversary of the Internal Guards Corps May 5, creation of the Naval Service of the MVD

The National Guard Naval Service Corps (Russian: Морские части Войск национальной гвардии Российской Федерации, romanized: Morskiye Chasti Voysk Natsional'noy Gvardii Rossiyskoy Federatsii) is the naval service, water police and coast guard branch of the National Guard Forces Command, National Guard of Russia. Formerly the Naval Service of the Internal Troops of Russia, it was established in 1978 through the fulfillment of a 1976 resolution of the Politburo of the Communist Party of the Soviet Union and a 1978 decree of the Council of Ministers of the Soviet Union.

== Brief history ==
The roots of this service may be traced to the May 5, 1976 Resolution "On the Protection of artificial structures on the Trans-Baikal and Far Eastern Railways" of the Politburo of the Communist Party of the Soviet Union. The resolution created an interdepartmental commission for inspection of underwater structures and make recommendations for their protection. As a result, problems have been identified for both the Baikal-Amur Mainline and the Trans-Siberian Railway, providing the basis for the 1978 formation of the first units of boats and naval divers of what was then the Naval Service of the Internal Troops of the Ministry of Internal Affairs of the Union of Soviet Socialist Republics or NS-IT-MIA-USSR (Морские части внутренних войск МВД CCCP, Morskiye Chasti Vnutrennikh Voysk MVD SSSR) with the approval of the suggested measures and subsequent decrees of the Council of Ministers. The naval service, while sporting uniforms similar to the Soviet Navy would provide public order and security, inland waters and waterways security and lifesaving functions for the Ministry of Internal Affairs. Only with the raising of the Naval Service did the problems facing the waterways, as well as lifesaving duties in these areas, began to be resolved.

In 1981 the current uniform and officer ranking system was adopted, in 1983 special flags were issued (today's flags feature the state naval ensign on the maroon background), and in 1985, the warrant officer and rating ranks were officially standardized. In 1984, through a general order of the chief of internal troops of the parts on the protection of sea lanes, two patrol boat divisions were raised. In 1988, on this basis, a separate detachment of patrol boats was established. A Divers' Training Center was included in its composition (established in 1987) for training and retraining of divers of the Naval Service, which would form the basis for today's National Guard Naval Diving Service.

Through a Decree of the USSR Council of Ministers on May 18, 1989 "On the Repair and technological enterprise of the nuclear fleet" (which gave military protection to personnel from today's FSUE Atomflot and the Murmansk Shipping Company) and a Decree of the Council on August 3 the same year the organizational and staffing structure was approved for the 2 naval patrol boat divisions assigned in Murmansk to the Naval Service of the MVD.

On the basis of part of personnel of the 1st Naval Detachment (Khabarovsk), the 5th Independent Maritime Training Division (Severobaikalsk) was raised on October 1, 1996. This division's cadets are trained in specialties: diver-shooter, mechanic, and boat captains. According to data for 2002, it created the basis for specialty training steering for signalmen.

As of April 15, 2016, the NS-IT-MIA-RF has transformed into the NGNSC-NGFC of the National Guard and reports directly to the Security Council.

== Naval Service Units ==
- 1st Detachment (Khabarovsk)
- 2nd Detachment (Murmansk)
- 5th Independent Maritime Training Division (Severobaikalsk, Buryatia)
- 32nd Detachment (Ozyorsk, Chelyabinsk Oblast)
- Independent Patrol Division (Sosnovy Bor, Leningrad Oblast)
- Naval Detachment of the NGFC Ural District Command (Yekaterinburg)

== Missions ==
- to ensure the safety of important public facilities and communications structures, located in the coastal lands and waters of the Russian Federation, the territorial seas, the rivers, lakes and other surface water bodies
- participation in disaster relief and other emergencies on the specified protected objects and structures in waterways (together with the Ministry of Emergency Situations and the Coast Guard of the FSB Border Service)
- Conducting anti-terrorism operations and combating illegal weapons trade in the inland and coastal waters of Russia
- participate jointly with the Police of Russia in maintaining public order and security in the important waterways located in areas with the most valuable natural resources, determining the list of which is approved by the Government of Russia
- assisting in border security with the Border Service of the FSB of Russia through the Coast Guard of the FSB Border Service
- wartime and peacetime functions as the inland and coastal counterweight of the Russian Navy and other uniformed organizations as may be called by the President in his duty as Supreme Commander of the Armed Forces and Chairman of the Security Council, through the Commander of the National Guard
- if necessary conduct lifesaving operations in strategic waters together with the Ministry of Emergency Situations

== Gallery ==
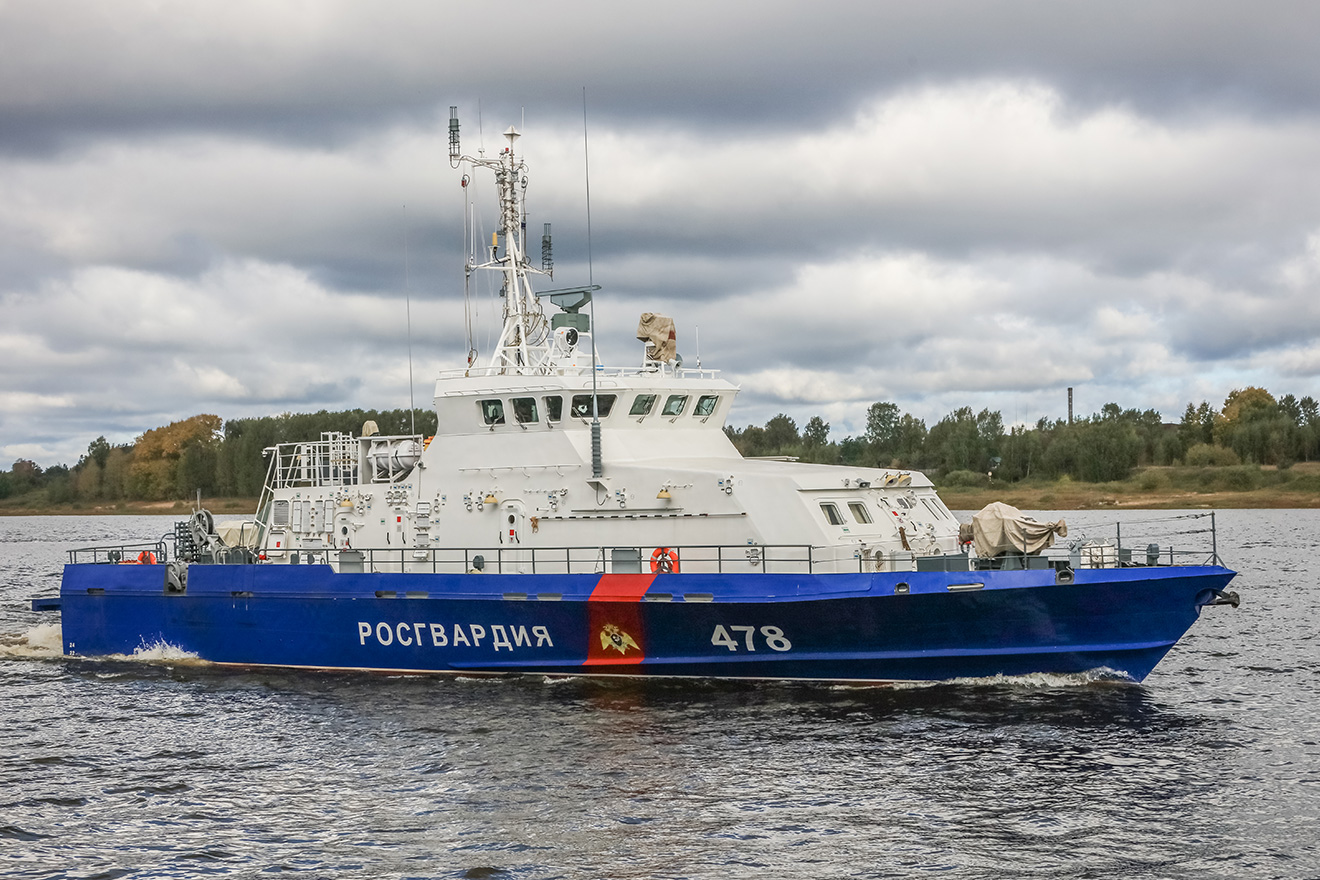
The Russian National Guard Grachonok-class anti-saboteur ship PDKA No. 478 in 2022

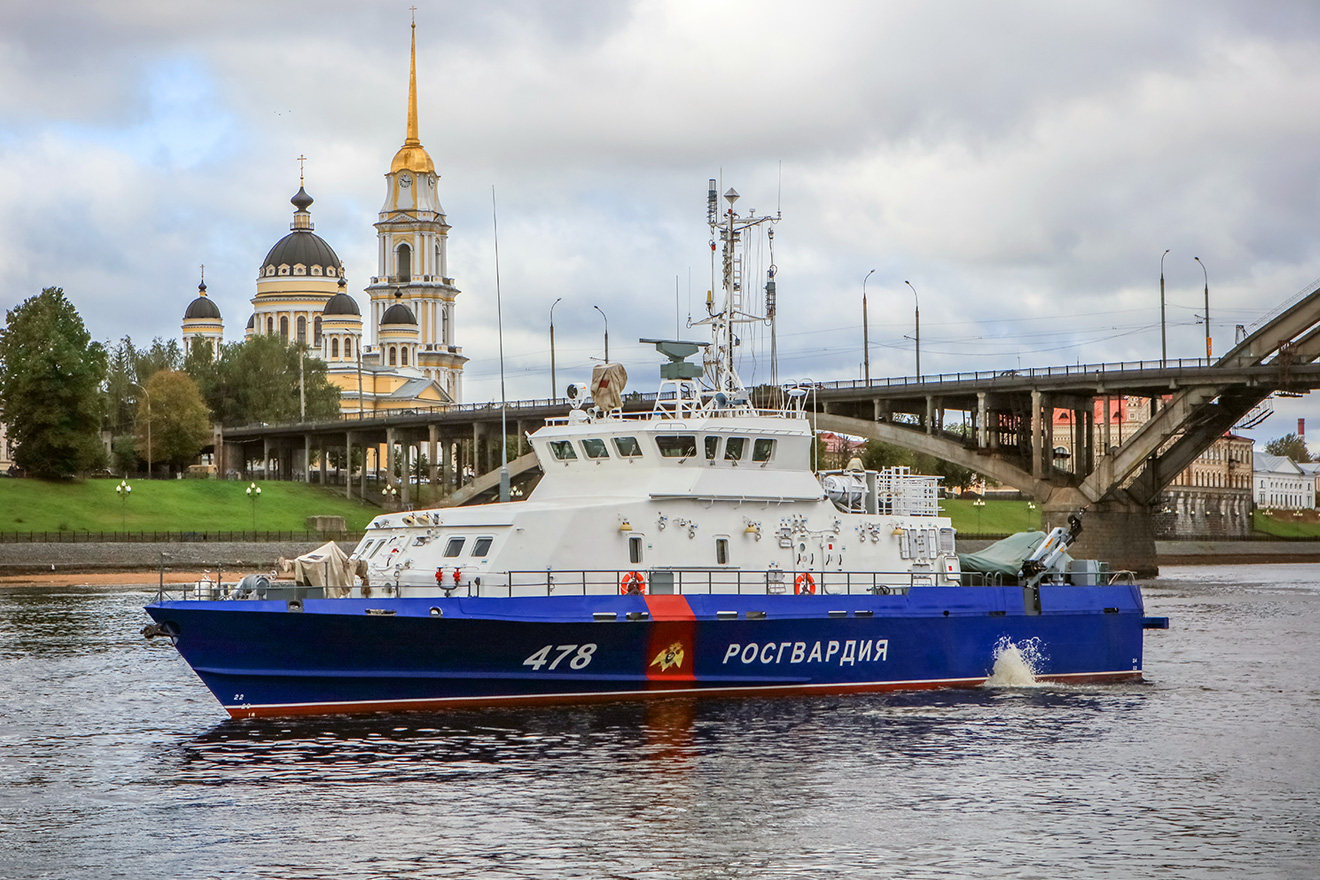
Russian National Guard's PDKA No. 478 at Rybinsk in 2022

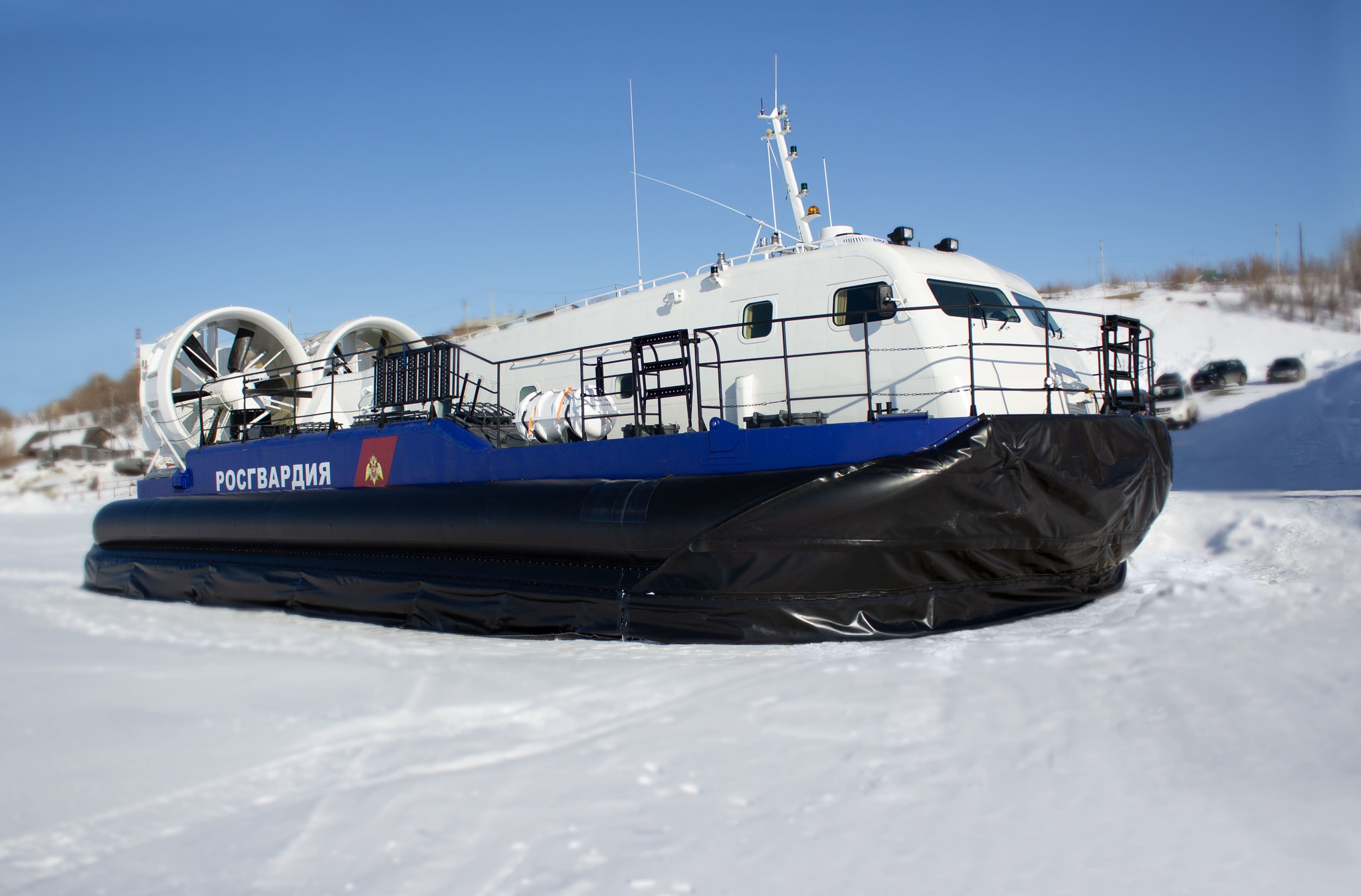
The Russian National Guard hovercraft Siverko-25 in 2018

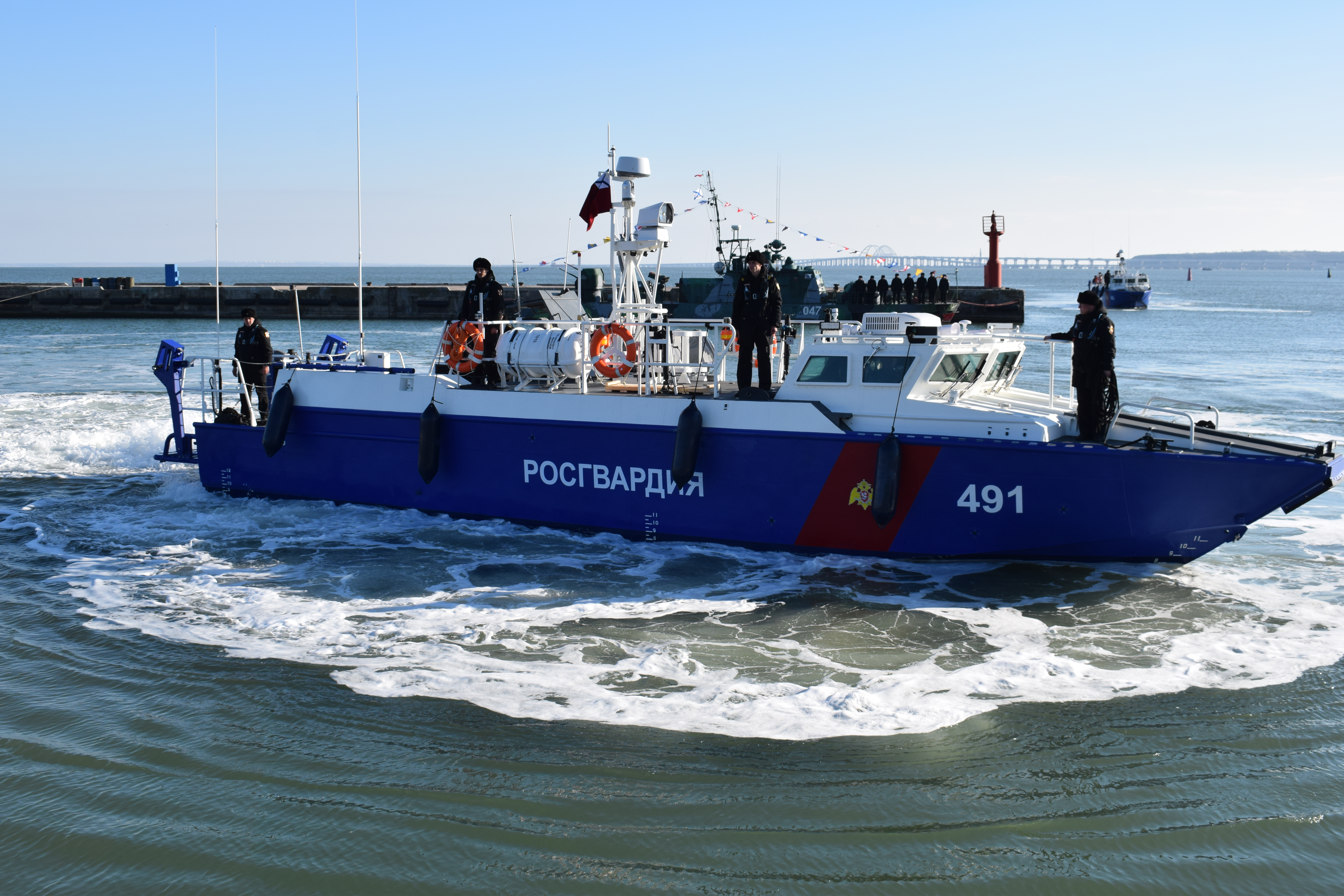
Russian National Guard BK-16-class landing craft at Kerch in 2019

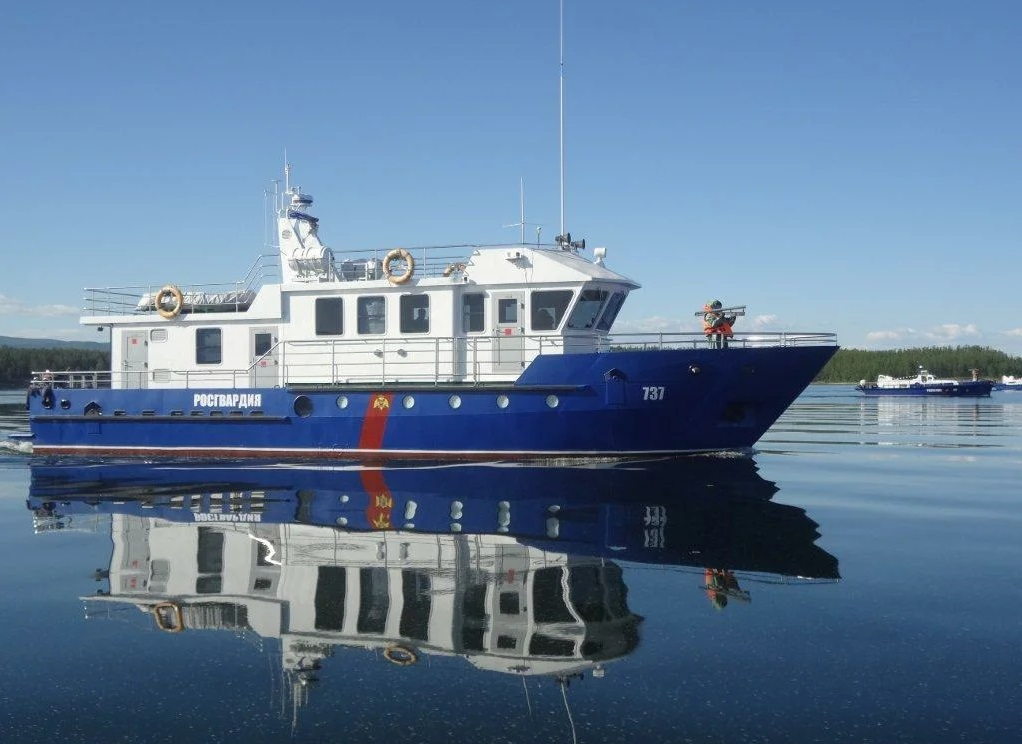
Russian National Guard vessels at Severobaykalsk in 2018

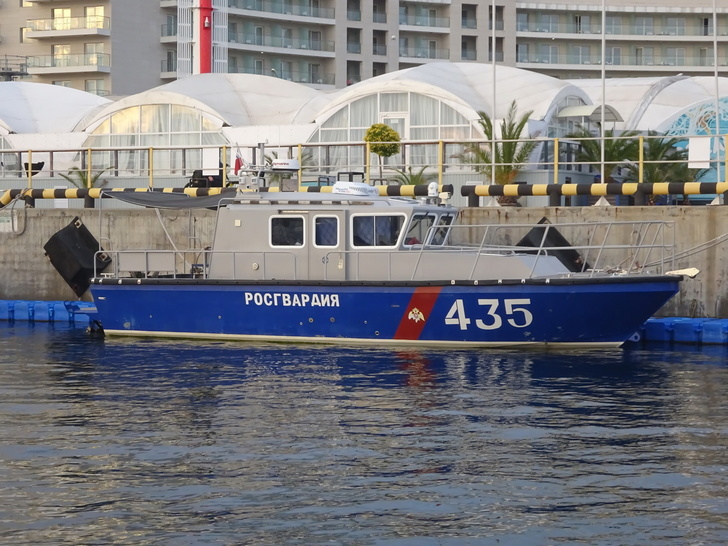
A Russian National Guard Afalina-class patrol boat in 2018

== See also ==
- National Guard of Russia
- National Guard Forces Command
- Coast Guard (Russia)
