= Vasily Savvin =

Soviet and Russian military officer (1939–2020)

- Native name: Василий Нестерович Саввин
- Born: 30 April 1939; Dobrino, Liskinsky District, Voronezh Oblast, Russian SFSR, Soviet Union
- Died: 24 February 2020 (aged 80) Saint Petersburg, Russia
- Buried: Serafimovskoe Cemetery
- Allegiance: Soviet Union; Russia
- Branch: Internal Troops of the Soviet Union; Internal Troops of Russia
- Service years: 1956–1993
- Rank: General-Polkovnik
- Awards: Order of the Red Star; Order "For Service to the Homeland in the Armed Forces of the USSR", 3rd Class

Vasily Nestorovich Savvin (Russian: Василий Нестерович Саввин; 30 April 1939 – 24 February 2020) was a Soviet and later Russian military officer who held a number of posts in country's Gendarmerie, reaching the rank of general-polkovnik. His career culminated with the command of the Internal Troops of the Soviet Union, becoming their last commander, and the first commander of their successor organization, the Internal Troops of Russia.

Savvin's career with the Ministry of Internal Affairs (MVD) began when he joined the Internal Troops in 1956, subsequently graduating with honours from the Ministry's military school, and rising through the ranks commanding platoons, companies and then battalions. He was transferred to the far north in 1969, serving at Murmansk in staff roles that took him from chief of staff and then commander of regiments, and then divisions, at first in the Arctic and then in Siberia. He eventually became head of the Internal Affairs Directorate for Siberia, and then the North-West and the Baltic States, before being appointed commander of the MVD's entire internal forces in September 1991. He saw out the dissolution of the Soviet Union in this post, and the reformation of the former Soviet organization as the Internal Troops of Russia in January 1992. He held the position until his retirement in 1993, and subsequently settled in Saint Petersburg, where he died in 2020.

== Early life and service ==
Savvin was born into a peasant family on 30 April 1939 in Dobrino, Liskinsky District, in Voronezh Oblast, then part of the Russian SFSR, in the Soviet Union. His father was killed in 1941 while fighting at the front during the Axis invasion of the Soviet Union. After sitting seven years of his schooling, he worked for a time on a collective farm, completing his studies with evening classes.

Savvin joined the Internal Troops of the Soviet Union, part of the Ministry of Internal Affairs (MVD), in 1956. He studied at the S. M. Kirov Ordzhonikidze Military School of the Ministry of Internal Affairs, graduating with honours in 1959. He was first assigned to command a platoon in Riga, and then a company. He became a member of the Communist Party of the Soviet Union in 1961, and enrolled as a student in the M. V. Frunze Military Academy in 1964. After graduating, again with honours, in 1967, he was appointed to command a battalion in Leningrad.

== Staff and senior posts ==
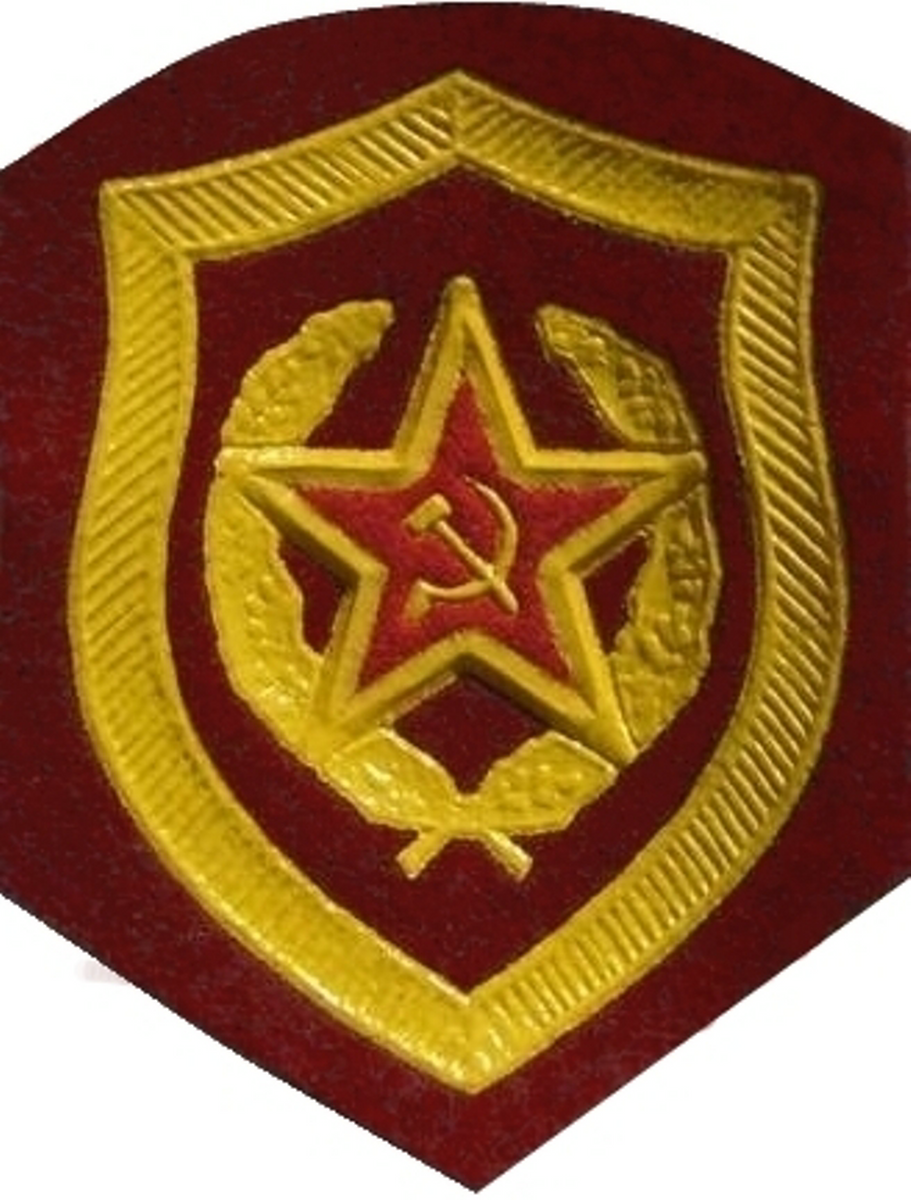
Insignia of the Internal Troops of the Soviet Union, Savvin's command prior to 23 January 1992

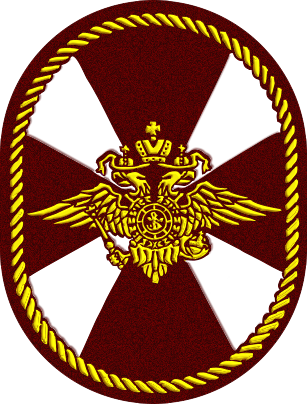
Insignia of the Internal Troops of Russia, Savvin's command subsequent to 23 January 1992

In 1969 Savvin was moved to the Arctic north of the Soviet Union, becoming chief of staff of the 590th escort regiment of the 44th escort division of the Ministry of Internal Affairs, based in Murmansk. He became commander of the regiment in 1972, and then in 1975 chief of staff of the MVD's escort division in Siberia. Promoted to polkovnik in 1979 he became chief of staff of the Ministry's Internal Affairs Directorate for Western Siberia, and in 1984 became head of the directorate. He had been promoted to general major in 1983, and in 1987 he transferred to head the Internal Affairs Directorate for the North-West and the Baltic States. While in this post he was promoted to general lieutenant in 1988.

On 21 September 1991 Savvin was appointed commander of the MVD's entire internal forces. He held the position during the dissolution of the Soviet Union at the end of 1991, and the reconstitution of the former Soviet forces as the Internal Troops of Russia on 23 January 1992. As such he became the last head of the Soviet Internal Troops, and the first head of the Russian Internal Troops. He remained in command until 23 December 1992. He retired from military service on 24 August 1993, having been promoted to general-polkovnik in 1991. In retirement he settled in Saint Petersburg, and helped to organize assistance for the families of deceased military personnel.

== Death and awards ==
Savvin died in Saint Petersburg on 24 February 2020 at the age of 80. General of the Army Viktor Zolotov, commander of the National Guard of Russia, the successor organization of the Internal Troops, offered his condolences, saying "Vasily Nesterovich was a courageous, strong-willed man, a real Russian officer who devoted his life to serving the Fatherland and strengthening the national security of the state. He always coped with the tasks with honour, in the most difficult emergency situations he showed a strong-willed character and a willingness to help." Savvin was buried in Saint Petersburg's Serafimovskoe Cemetery on 28 February.

Over his career he had been awarded the Order of the Red Star and the Order "For Service to the Homeland in the Armed Forces of the USSR" Third Class, as well as various medals.
