= Central Orsha-Khingan Red Banner National Guard District =

National Guard of Russia

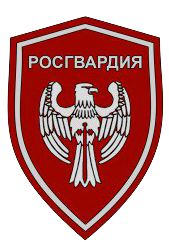
- Emblem of the Troops of the Central Federal District of the National Guard of Russia
- Active: 15 July – 2 February 1939 (as CheKa Moscow District); 20 May 1943 – 7 May 1986 (as field Division); 7 May 1986 – present (as security command)
- Country: Russia
- Branch: National Guard of Russia
- Type: Gendarmerie
- Role: Internal security
- Part of: National Guard Forces Command
- Garrison/HQ: Moscow, st. Ivanteevskaya, 5

Commanders
- Current commander: Colonel general Aleksandr Popov

The Central Orsha-Khingan Order of Zhukov Red Banner National Guard District is a regional district of the National Guard Forces Command, National Guard of Russia. It is headquartered in Moscow and under the command of Colonel General Aleksandr Popov (ru:Попов, Александр Анатольевич). General Popov was appointed to the post by a Ukaz of 30 July 2021.

The district traces its heraldic descent to the 192nd Rifle Division (2nd formation) (ru:192-я стрелковая дивизия (2-го формирования)) of the Red Army of the World War II, which became 76th Orsha-Khingan Red Banner Convoy Division of the escort forces of the MVD USSR in 1945–46.

== History ==
The district traces its heraldic descent to the 192nd Rifle Division (2nd formation) of the Red Army of the World War II, which became 76th Orsha-Khingan Red Banner Convoy Division of the escort forces of the MVD USSR in 1945–46.

=== Red Army service: 192nd Rifle Division (Second Formation) ===
The second formation of the 192nd Rifle Division was formed on 20 May 1943, as part of the Western Front. The 192nd Rifle Division was established by merging the 64th Division (Second formation) and 112th independent Rifle Brigade. The division was formed in the vicinity of the village of Svinoroyka, Sychevsky district, Smolensk Oblast.

Since 7 August 1943, the division has taken part in offensive battles for the villages of Rysava, Rechitsa, Terentyevo, Nikolskoye, Shimeni and Yushkovo of the Smolensk region during the Smolensk operation, as part of the 68th Army of the Western Front. On September 25, 1943, the division distinguished itself during the Battle of Smolensk, when the city was retaken from the Germans. From October 1943 to 28 January 1944 - in active defense at the turn of Rossosna - Bobrov.

Since 23 April it became subordinate to the 31st Army as part of the 3rd Belorussian Front and took up defense at the Olkhovka, Osinstroy line.

=== Divisional Assignments during the Second World War ===
Date	Front	Army	Corps	Notes
1 June 1943	Reserve of the Supreme High Command	68th Army	-	-
1 July 1943	Reserve of the Supreme High Command	68th Army	-	-
01.08.1943	Western Front	68th Army	72nd Rifle Corps	-
01.09.1943	Western Front	68th Army	72nd Rifle Corps	-
01.10.1943	Western Front	68th Army	72nd Rifle Corps	-
01.11.1943	Western Front	68th Army	72nd Rifle Corps	-
01.12.1943	Western Front	5th Red Banner Army	72nd Rifle Corps	-
01.01.1944	Western Front	49th Army	61st Rifle Corps	-
01.02.1944	Western Front	49th Army	61st Rifle Corps	-
1 March 1944	Western Front	49th Army	61st Rifle Corps	-
1 April 1944	Western Front	31st Army	71st Rifle Corps	-
01.05.1944	3rd Belorussian Front	31st Army	71st Rifle Corps	-
01.06.1944	3rd Belorussian Front	31st Army	71st Rifle Corps	-
01.07.1944	3rd Belorussian Front	31-я армия	71-й стрелковый корпус	-
01.08.1944	3rd Belorussian Front	31st Army	71-й стрелковый корпус	-
01.09.1944	3rd Belorussian Front		113th Rifle Corps	-
01.10.1944	3rd Belorussian Front	39th Army	113th Rifle Corps	-
01.11.1944	3rd Belorussian Front	39th Army	113th Rifle Corps	-
01.12.1944	3rd Belorussian Front	39-я армия	113-й стрелковый корпус	-
01.01.1945	3rd Belorussian Front	39-я армия	113-й стрелковый корпус	-
01.02.1945	3rd Belorussian Front	39th Army	113-й стрелковый корпус	-
01.03.1945	3rd Belorussian Front (Земландская группа войск)	39-я армия	113-й стрелковый корпус
01.04.1945	3rd Belorussian Front (Земландская группа войск)	39-я армия	113-й стрелковый корпус
01.05.1945	Reserve of the Supreme High Command	5th Army	113th Rifle Corps
01.06.1945	Reserve of the Supreme High Command	39th Army	113th Rifle Corps	-
01.07.1945	Transbaikal Front	39th Army	113th Rifle Corps	-
01.08.1945	Transbaikal Front	39th Army	113th Rifle Corps	-
01.09.1945	Transbaikal Front	39th Army	113th Rifle Corps	-

=== MVD SSSR service: Internal Troops division ===
In 1945-46 the 192nd Rifle Division became 1st Department for Escort and Protection of the Internal Troops of the Soviet Union (VV MVD SSSR), located in Moscow.

On 6 May 1951, the NKVD escort division was reorganized into the 1st Orsha-Khingan Red Banner Department of the Ministry of Internal Affairs of the Moscow Region. On 15 December 1968, the 1st Department became the 36th Convoy Orsha-Khingan Red Banner Division of the Internal Troops.

=== MVD SSSR service: administration ===
On 7 May 1986 the division was reorganised and expanded into the Orshansko-Khinganskaya Red Banner Central Administration Internal Troops MVD SSSR, located in Moscow (Military Unit Number 7554). From that point in time the 43rd Convoy Division of the MVD in Minsk was attached to the Central Administration.

In 1990 the district's troops included:

- 43rd Convoy Division;
- 32nd Convoy Brigade;
- 499th, 501st, 503rd, 507th, 587th, 597th, 638th, 667th Convoy Regiments;
- 504th Training Regiment, Sofrino;
- 13th, 50th Special Motorised Militia Battalions (OMON)
- 444th Independent Convoy Battalion, Ryazan

In 1989 the 3rd Special Motorised Militia Regiment of the Dzerzhinsky Division was reorganised as the separate 23rd Special Motorised Militia Brigade.

=== MVD RF service ===
With the dissolution of the Soviet Union the district became part of the reduced Internal Troops of Russia in 1991–92. In January 1993, the Moscow Orsha-Khingansky Red Banner District of the Internal Troops of the Ministry of Internal Affairs of Russia was formed. Combat troops subordinated to the Moscow District carried out combat missions throughout the two wars in the North Caucasus - the First and Second Chechen Wars.

Reportedly in 1999 the 23rd Special Motorised Militia Brigade was expanded into the 55th Division of the VV.

In 2008, the Moscow District was transformed into the Central Regional Command of the Internal Troops of the Ministry of Internal Affairs of Russia.

In 2013, in Russian service, the district included the Special Designation Division; three other VV divisions; a special designation brigade; five regiments; three special designation detachments (Peresvet, Scythian, and Merkury) the 102nd, 104th, 109th, 107th, and 681st Special Mobile Police Battalions, all in Moscow; the 128th Special Mobile Police Battalion (Voronezh); the 547th Special Mobile Police Battalion (Elektrostal), the 414th Independent Special Mobile Police Battalion (Yaroslavl); the 423rd Independent SMBP (Lyubertsy); the 597th SMBP at Kursk; the 667th SMBP at Tula; the 129th SMBP at Lipetsk; two other SMBPs, including one at Tver; and a total of three other SMBPs, and eight VV battalions.

=== National Guard of Russia ===
Along with the rest of the Russian Internal Troops, the personnel, equipment, and infrastructure of the district became part of the new National Guard of Russia when the Internal Troops were dissolved and reorganised in mid-2016.

The Institute for the Study of War wrote on 21 March 2023 that:

" the "Russian Federal Security Service and ..Rosgvardia launched a criminal investigation into the Deputy Commander of the Rosgvardia’s Central District, Major General Vadim Dragomiretsky on March 20. Russian State Duma Parliamentarian Aleksandr Khinshtein stated that Dragomiretsky is suspected of receiving multimillion-dollar bribes and abusing his power and will face subsequent dismissal from his position. Khinshtein said that officials forced Dragomiretsky to admit his guilt in a written confession. "Dragomiretsky was suspected of having received bribes from a contractor who reconstructed a military unit in the Moscow Oblast."

== List of commanders ==
Since 2016, the Central Orsha-Khingan Red Banner National Guard District has had two Commanders:

- Colonel general Igor Golloyev: 6 December 2017 - 30 July 2021;
- Colonel general Aleksandr Popov: 30 July 2021 – present.

== Organization ==
The Central Orsha-Khingan Red Banner National Guard District is in charge for 18 Federal subjects of Russia, each of them having a dedicated National Guard command. Both Moscow and Moscow Oblast have a Main Directorate each, while other Oblasts have Directorates. The Central District also has at its disposal:

- Separate Operational Purpose Division
- 12th, 55th, 95th National Guard Divisions (as of 2013)
- 21st operational brigade; (as of 2013)
- Special rapid response units;
- Mobile special units;
- Licensing and permit work and private security units (distinct from the territorial organization);
- Special motorized military units;
- Military units for the protection of important state facilities;
- Special cargo, aviation, marine and others military formations.

== Awards and decorations ==
Ribbon	Award	Notes
	Order of Zhukov	
	Order of the Red Banner	
