= Internal Troops of Russia =

Former paramilitary force of the Russian Ministry of Internal Affairs (1991–2016)

Internal Troops of the Ministry of Internal Affairs of the Russian Federation Внутренние войска Министерства внутренних дел Vnutrenniye voyska Ministerstva vnutrennikh del
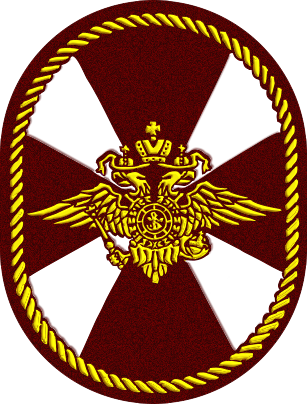
- Patch of Internal Troops

- Emblem of Ministry of Internal Affairs and Internal Troops of Russia

- Flag of Internal Troops: a 2:3 white flag with rose madder cross pattée and emblem of Internal Troops in the center of it
- Abbreviation: VV MVD

Agency overview
- Formed: 20 October 1991
- Preceding agencies: Special Corps of Gendarmes (1811–1917); Internal Troops of the Soviet Union (1918–1991)
- Dissolved: 5 April 2016
- Superseding agency: National Guard of Russia
- Employees: 182,000 in 2012

Jurisdictional structure
- Federal agency: Russia
- Operations jurisdiction: Russia
- Governing body: Ministry of Internal Affairs
- General nature: Federal law enforcement; Gendarmerie; Civilian police

Operational structure
- Headquarters: Moscow
- Agency executive: Viktor Zolotov, Commander-in-Chief (2014-2016)

Notables
- Significant operations: 2004–2005 Russian benefits monetization protests; 2011–2013 Russian protests; 2014 anti-war protests in Russia
- Anniversary: March 27

The Internal Troops of the Ministry for Internal Affairs of the Russian Federation (Russian: Внутренние войска Министерства внутренних дел (ВВ МВД), romanized: Vnutrenniye voyska Ministerstva vnutrennikh del (VV MVD)) was a paramilitary force of the Ministry of Internal Affairs of Russia from 1991 to 2016.

The Internal Troops was a gendarmerie-like force that supported the Russian police, dealt with crowd control during riots and internal conflicts, and guarded highly-important facilities such as nuclear power plants. The Internal Troops was involved in all conflicts and violent disturbances in modern Russia, including the First and Second Chechen Wars, where it fell under direct military command during wartime and fulfilled missions of local defence and rear area security. The Internal Troops consisted of both volunteers and conscripts, which caused the number of active service members to fluctuate, with less than 200,000 upon their disestablishment from a peak strength of 350,000, and had experienced a shortage of officers since 1998. The final commander-in-chief of the Internal Troops was Colonel General Viktor Zolotov from 2014 to 2016.

The Internal Troops claimed descent from the Special Corps of Gendarmes of the Russian Empire founded in 1811 and entered their modern form as a paramilitary of the interior ministry of the Russian Soviet Federative Socialist Republic in 1918. It was formed from the Russian branch of the Internal Troops of the Soviet Union in 1991 shortly before the dissolution of the Soviet Union. On 5 April 2016, the Interior Troops was officially split from the Ministry of Internal Affairs to form the basis of the National Guard of Russia.

== History ==
=== Internal Troops of the Russian Empire ===
The Internal Troops claimed descent from the Separate Corps of Gendarmes of the Russian Empire, which began forming on 27 March 1811 as gendarmerie units of the Imperial Russian Army. The Corps evolved into a uniformed security police agency responsible for law enforcement and state security for most of the 19th century and a small part of the 20th century. The Corps also fell under the command of the Ministry of Police of the Russian Empire and the Guberniya.

=== Internal Troops of the Soviet Union ===
The modern Internal Troops of Russia were raised in 1918 by the All-Russian Central Executive Committee, one of the main government bodies of the Russian Soviet Federative Socialist Republic (RSFSR), as a paramilitary force attached to of the People's Commissariat for Internal Affairs, the interior ministry of the RSFSR. In 1919, it was reorganized into the Internal Security Forces (Voyska vnutrenney okhrany Respubliki, VOHR) and transferred to the Cheka, then in 1922 into the Joint State Political Directorate (OGPU) in 1922. The Cheka and OGPU were the secret police agencies of the RSFSR and later the Soviet Union.

On 28 July 1988, the Presidium of the Supreme Soviet issued a decree "On duties and rights of the Internal Troops of the USSR MVD when safeguarding public order", clarifying its role in the cracking Soviet regime. However, the Internal Troops were still a part of the Soviet Armed Forces and this state of affairs pleased no one. The Armed Forces did not want to be seen as a force of internal suppression, especially after the disastrous Afghan War. The MVD was finding itself having to extinguish increasingly frequent and violent hot spots and to cope with growing and increasingly well organised and equipped criminals. For this the MVD needed more fire power. On 21 March 1989, the Presidium decided to take the Internal Troops out of the Armed Forces and the Ministry of Defense and give them to the Internal Affairs Ministry.

=== Russian Internal Troops ===
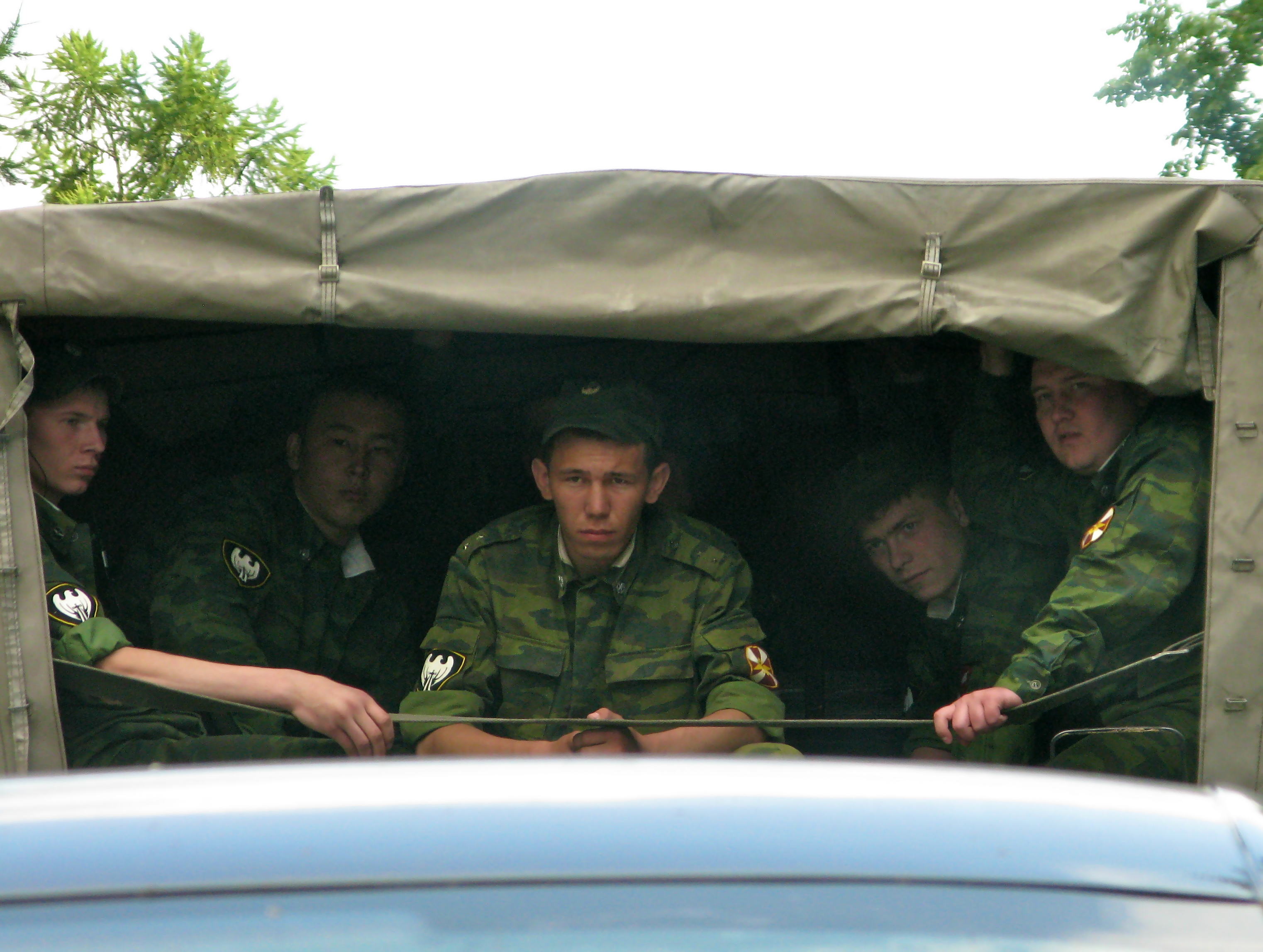
Internal Troops conscripts in 2009

In 1990, the establishment of the Russian SFSR's MVD meant that the Internal Troops in the SFSR were now subordinated to the republican ministry. With the dissolution of the Soviet Union at the end of 1991, the Internal Troops of the Soviet Union were reconstituted in the Russian Federation as the Internal Troops of Russia on 23 January 1992, with their last commander as the Soviet force, General-Polkovnik Vasily Savvin, becoming their first commander as a Russian one. In 1997, 14 controllers of the Internal Troops were arrested for corruption and collaboration with a local organized crime group for having stolen more than 400 kg of gold from an industry of gold in Kasimov, during the Kasimov war.

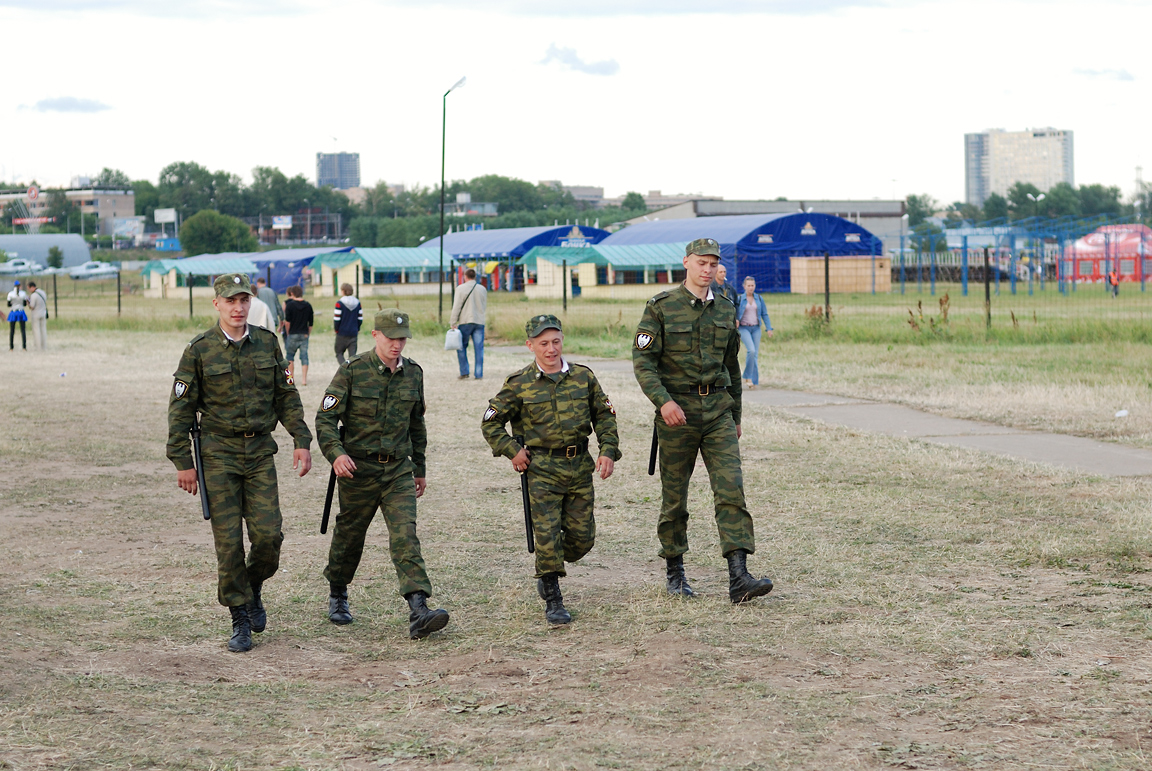
A group of Internal Troops of the MVD in 2007

With the April 2016 foundation of the National Guard of Russia, the Internal Troops were removed from the MVD and dissolved, becoming the National Guard Forces (Войска национальной гвардии, Voyska Natsionalnoy Gvardi) which now reported directly to the Security Council of Russia and its chairman, the President of Russia.

== Legal basis ==
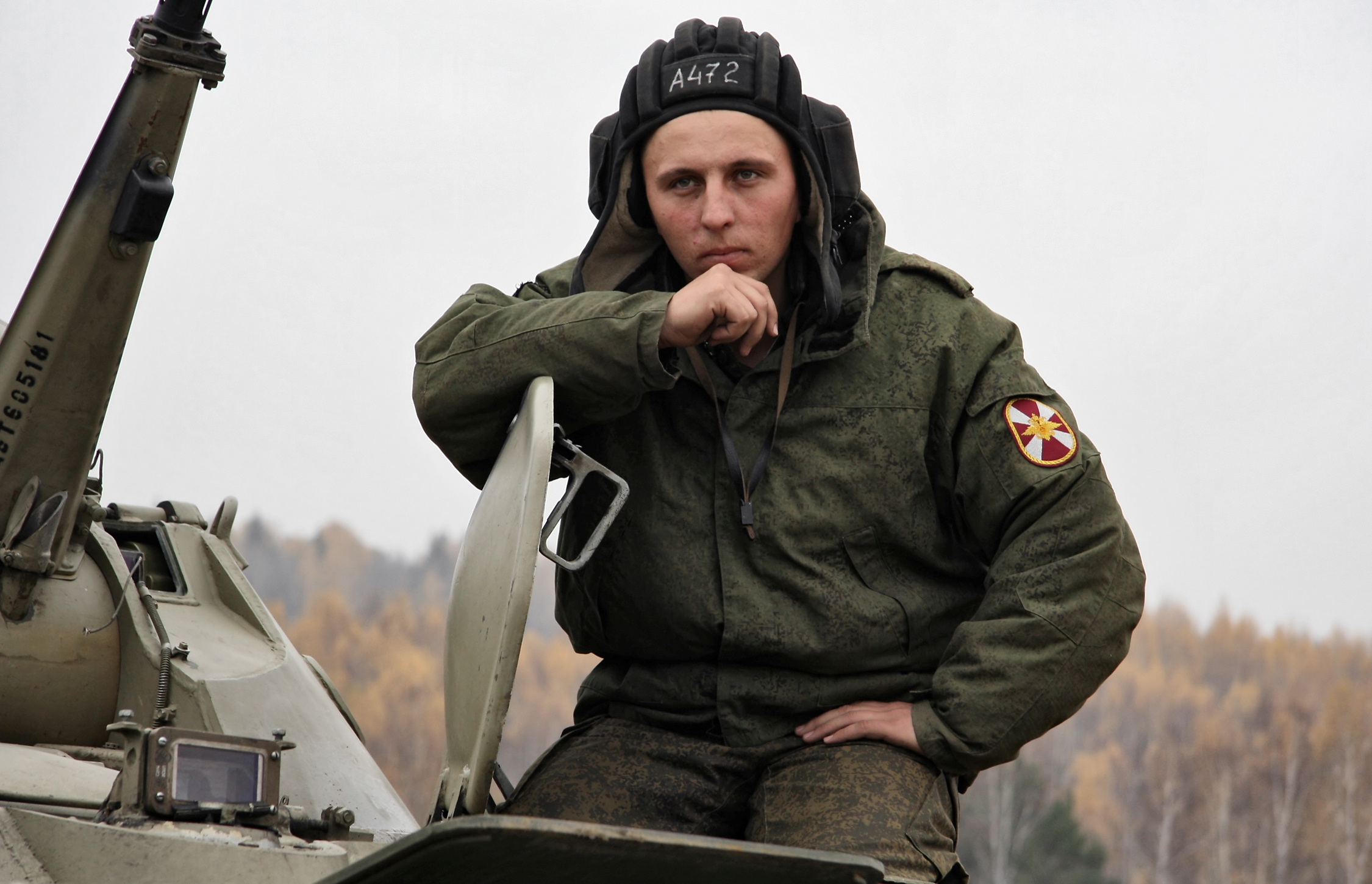
A VV MVD serviceman in 2012

The Federal Law No.27-173 was signed into law on 6 February 1997. The law set the operational standards for the Internal Troops of Russia. The law is entitled "On the Russian Federation Ministry of Internal Affairs Internal Troops". When supporting a state-of-emergency regime, Internal Troops were paid salary increases and additional monetary payments according to federal laws and other legal acts approved by the Minister of Internal Affairs. Article 38 granted senior operational commanders the right to call in subunits of special motorized formations and military units outside their deployment areas for a period of up to one month.

The federal law also detailed the important role that the Russian Ministry of Defense played in the affairs of the MVD's Internal Troops when crises arose. For example, MOD was responsible for providing airliners for supporting Internal Troop activities during emergency situations, and conditions of armed conflicts; carrying out the stockpiling and echelon armaments and military equipment, ammunition, fuel and supplies for the mobilization deployment of the Internal Troops in wartime; and transferring arms and military equipment free of charge to the Internal Troops through support services based on special decisions of the federal government, and rendering assistance in the repair and restoration of damaged arms and military equipment.

== General organisation ==
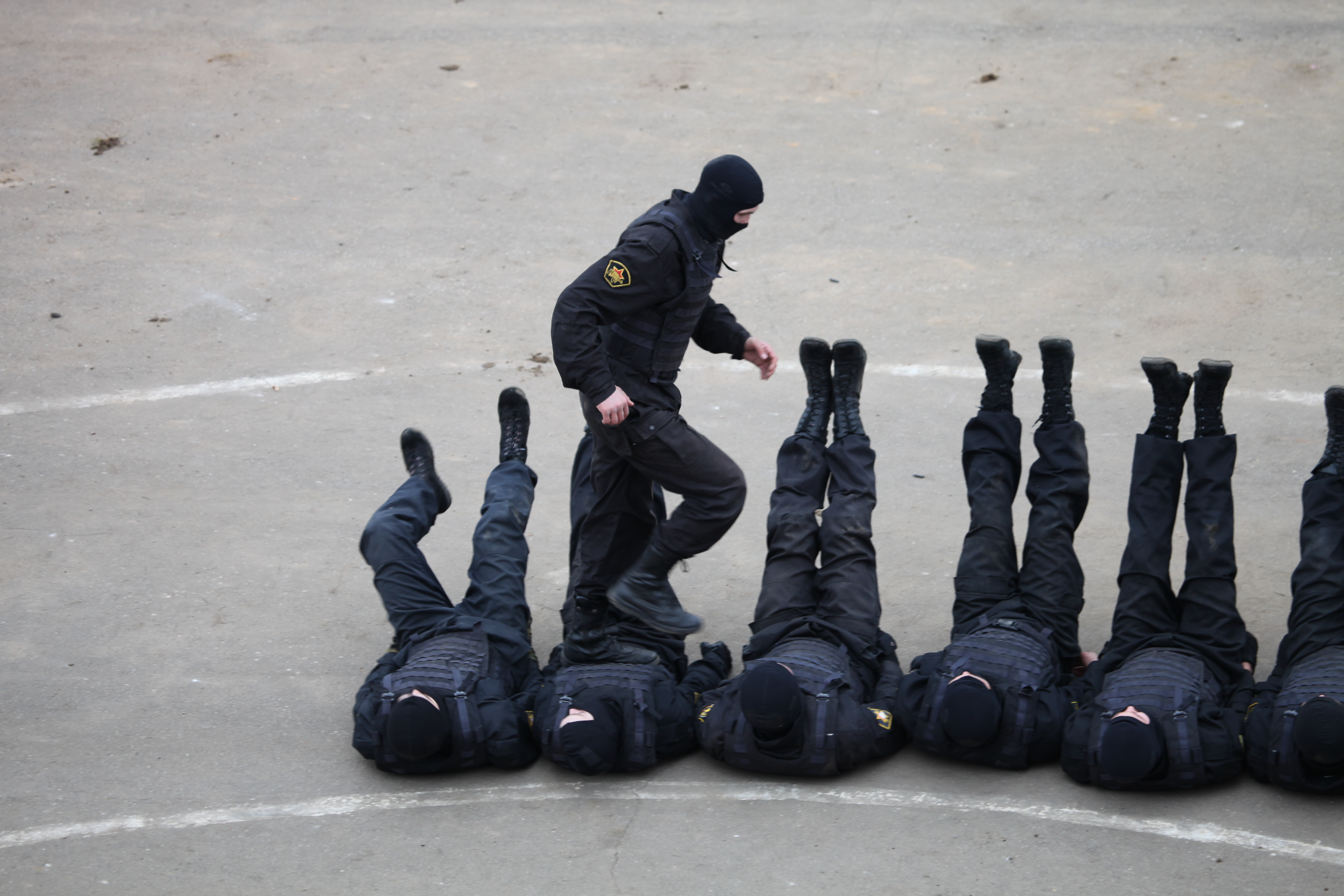
An elite group of Vityaz special forces personnel during a public exposition in 2012

Despite being subordinated to civilian MVD authority, Internal Troops were a paramilitary force with a centralized system of ranks, command, and service. The Chief Commander and Staff of the troops reported only to Ministry of Internal Affairs, maintaining their separate chain of command. The Chief Commander was concurrently First Deputy Minister of Internal Affairs. VV units in the Soviet Union were predominantly formed up of conscripts drafted by the same system as for the Soviet Army. Modern Internal Troops in Russia, as in Ukraine, experienced a slow transition to the contract personnel system. VV officers were trained in both own special academies and the Army's military academies.

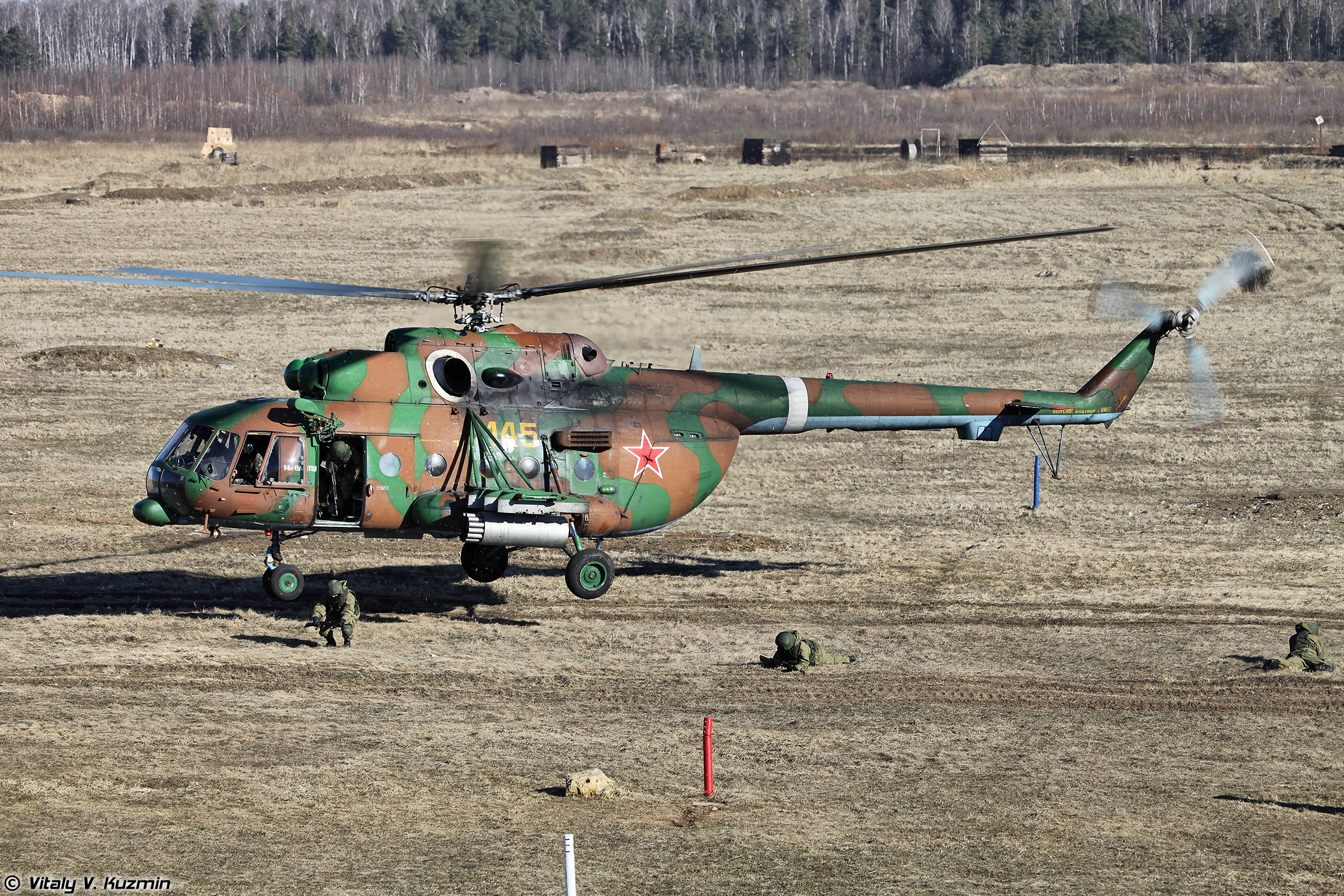
VV MVD assault group landing from a Mil Mi-8AMTSh helicopter of the Internal Troops Aviation Service during an exercise in 2014

The main kinds of Internal Troops were field units, various facility-guarding units, special motorized units, riot control and patrol units, and special forces like Rus. Since the 1980s, spetsnaz units were created within the VV to deal with terrorism and hostage crises. Fields units were essentially light motorized infantry, similar to respective regular army units by their organization and weapons. They and the special forces have been heavily engaged in the armed conflicts in Chechnya and the broader North Caucasus.

=== Districts and formations ===
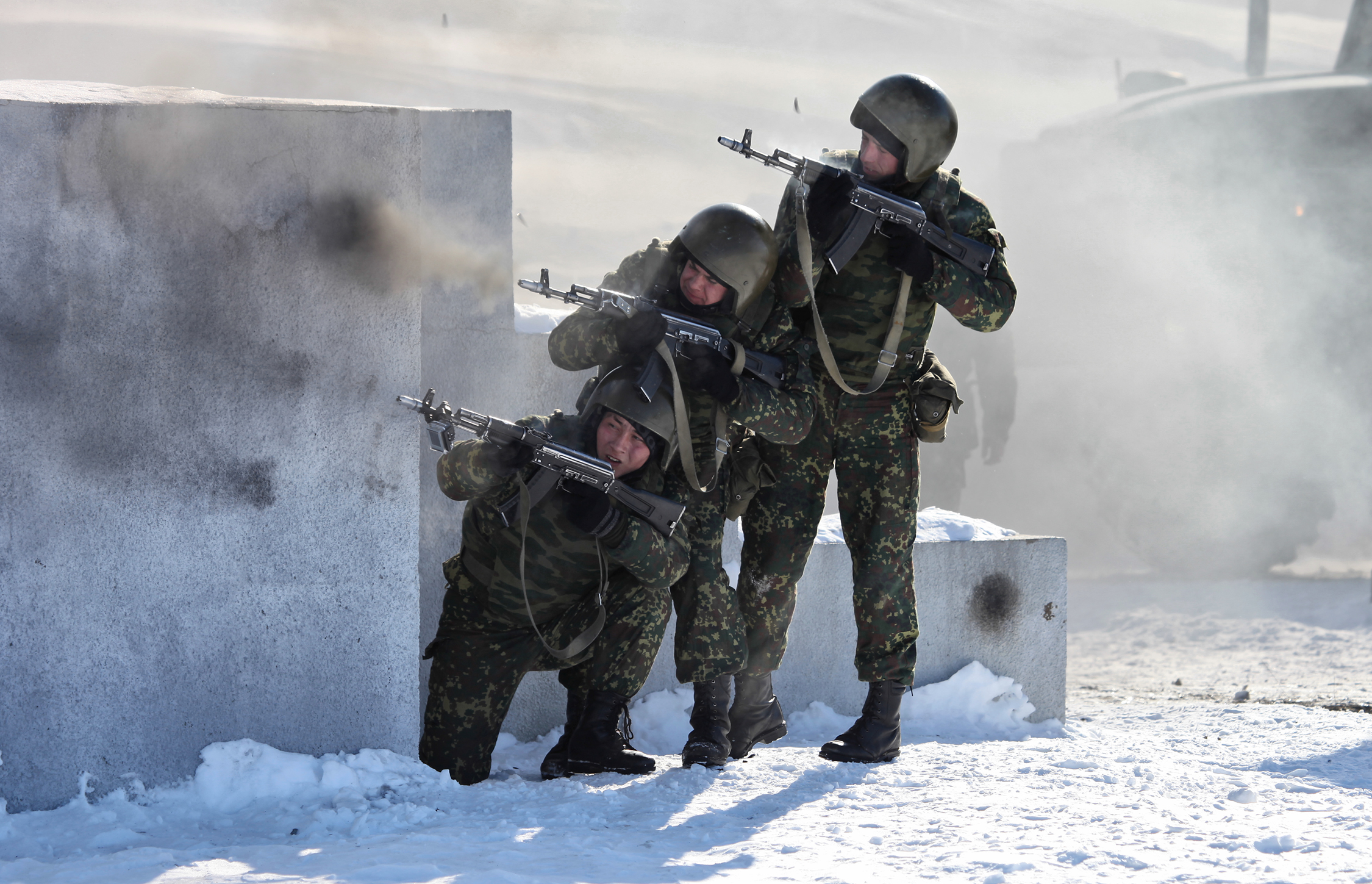
The VV 33rd Special Purpose Unit "Peresvet" during a training exercise in 2013

The Russian Internal Troops comprised headquarters, military units, military training institutions and the institutions for Internal Troops activities, and maintenance and administration bodies. The largest units were located in all major cities.

Internal Troops districts:

- Northwestern District
  - 63rd, 33rd Operational Brigades of Special Designation (OBrON; V/Ch 3526, Lebyazhye); 124th VV Regiment, 614th VV Regiment Koryazhma; 2nd Marine VV Detachment; 110th Separate Special Motorised Police Battalion, St Petersburg; 2nd Separate Special Motorised Police Battalion St Petersburg; five other Special Motorised Police Battalions; 28th VV Special Purpose Detachment.
- Moscow Orshansko-Hingansky Order of the Red Banner District
  - Separate Operational Purpose Division (the "Dzerzhinsky Division") (Balashikha, in the east of Moscow)
  - 604th Red Banner Special Purpose Centre "Vityaz" ODON (V/Ch 3179); 12th, 55th, 95th VV Divisions; 551st, 687th, 503rd, 649th, 591st VV Regiments; one independent brigade of special designation, 21st at Sofrino, Moscow Oblast, established 10 October 1988 from 504th Training Regiment; eight independent VV battalions; 16 Special Motorised Police Battalions; three special purpose detachments including Zubr; other units.
- North Caucasus District
  - 2nd Independent Special Purpose Division; 47th, 49th Independent Mountain Warfare Brigade of VV (V/Ch 3748, Vladikavkaz), and 22nd (military unit 3642, Kalach-na-Donu), 46th Order of Zhukov Independent Brigade of Special Designation (V/Ch 3025, Groznyy), 50th Independent Brigade of Operational Designation (military unit 3660, Novocherkassk), 102nd Separate Brigade of Operational Designation (Makhachkala) (Military Unit Number 6752), 424th Independent Brigades of Operational Designation; five VV regiments; 140th VV Artillery Regiment; seven Special Motorised Police Battalions; 10 independent VV battalions; 358th Separate Reconnaissance Battalion (military unit 6776, Grozny); 358th, 346th, 372nd, 398th VV Reconnaissance Battalions; special purpose detachments; other units. The 674th Regiment of Operational Designation was later reported at Mozdok.
- Privolzhsky District
  - 94th Red Banner Order of Zhukov Division, Sarov; 43rd Regiment VV, Sarov; another VV regiment, Sarov; 561st Regiment (Military Unit Number 3424, Dzerzhinsk); 34th Independent Operational Brigade (OBRON) (military unit 3671, Bogorodsk/Nizhny Novgorod); 86th Special Mobile Police Battalion, Kazan; 26th Special Purpose Detachment (ooSpN) "Bars" (military unit 5598, Kazan); 428th Separate Battalion (Military Unit 3730, Kazan); 79th Division (brigade(?)) (military unit 6676, Kirov); 739th, 488th, 419th, unidentified (Ufa), 113th (Samara), 738th (Cheboksary), unidentified (Volgograd) Special Motorised Police Battalions; 379th Independent Battalion (Zeleny, Military Unit 6819?);› 29th Special Purpose Detachment (ooSpN) named after. MM. Shaimuratov "Bulat" (military unit 6795, Ufa); 54th Independent Operational Brigade (Perm); 35th Independent Brigade (Samara); unidentified VV regiment, Tolyatti; 589th VV Regiment, Zarechny; 20th Special Purpose Detachment "Viking," Saratov.
- Ural District
  - 93rd VV Division, Chelyabinsk, 42nd, 545th, 546th, 562nd Regiments, 95th VV Regiment (Kopeiisk), 23rd VV Special Purpose Detachment Mechel, Chelyabinsk, 928th Ind VV Battalion (Prezerny), 96th VV Division (Kalinovka-1), 543rd VV Regiment (Novouralsk), 18th VV Regiment (Nizhny Tagil), 138th VV Regiment (Lesnoi), 12th VV Special Purpose Detachment Ural, Nizhny Tagil, 620th Regiment (military unit 3474, Yekaterinburg); 395th Ind Mobile Police Battalion, Yekaterinberg, 131st Ind Mobile Police Battalion, Persyabinsk.
- Siberian District
  - 42nd, 82nd VV Brigades, 91st Red Banner Order of Suvorov VV Brigade (V/Ch 7486, Красноярск), other, smaller units.
- Eastern District

Military units under direct subordination:

- The Central Communications
- Engineering Center
- Intelligence Directorate Internal Troops under the Intelligence Chief-Deputy Chief of Staff of the Internal Troops.

== Commanders-in-Chief ==
Commanders-in-chief of the Internal Troops of the Ministry of Internal Affairs of Russia since 1991:

- Colonel General Vasily Savvin (1991–1992)
- General of the Army Anatoly Kulikov (1992–1995)
- Colonel-General Anatoly Romanov (1995)
- Colonel-General Anatoly Shkirko (1995–1997)
- Colonel-General Leonty Shevtsov (1997–1998)
- Colonel-General Pavel Maslov (1998–1999)
- Colonel-General Vyacheslav Ovchinnikov (1999–2000)
- General of the Army Vyacheslav Tikhomirov (2000–2004)
- General of the Army Nikolay Rogozhkin (2004–2014)
- General of the Army Viktor Zolotov (2014–2016)

== Missions ==
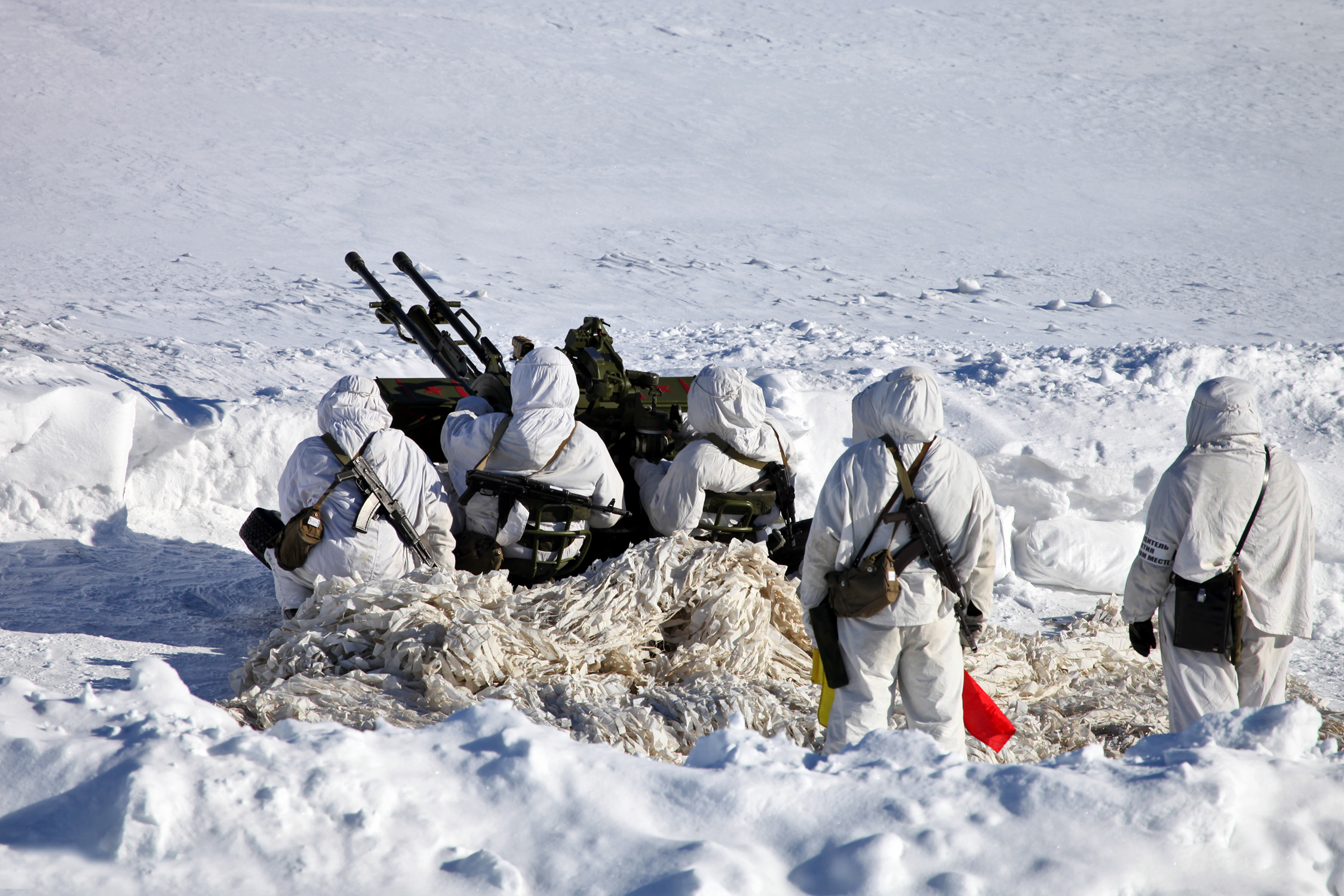
A ZU-23-2 anti-aircraft gun crew of VV special forces during an exercise in 2013

- Security – to guard "key" state institutions (except for the Kremlin and the highest echelons of the government which are guarded by the Federal Protective Service (FSO)), nuclear facilities, special storage depots and military bases.
- National defence – to conduct rear area security operations and all military operations within national borders, counter-intelligence authority in wartime.
- Prisoner transport – in Soviet times, also guarded and operated the Gulag camps. Today: convict convoyage and transport. Security and operation of prisons have been performed by the Federal Penitentiary Service since its creation in 1994.
- Public order – to assist the Russian Police for riot control operations when OMON units are not available.
- Border control – to assist the Russian Federal Border Service in the protection of the State border of the Russian Federation.
- Military police functions.
- Counter-terrorist operations (VV special forces units such as Vityaz and Rus).
- Possible counterweight to the regular military, especially during the Soviet era.

== Equipment ==
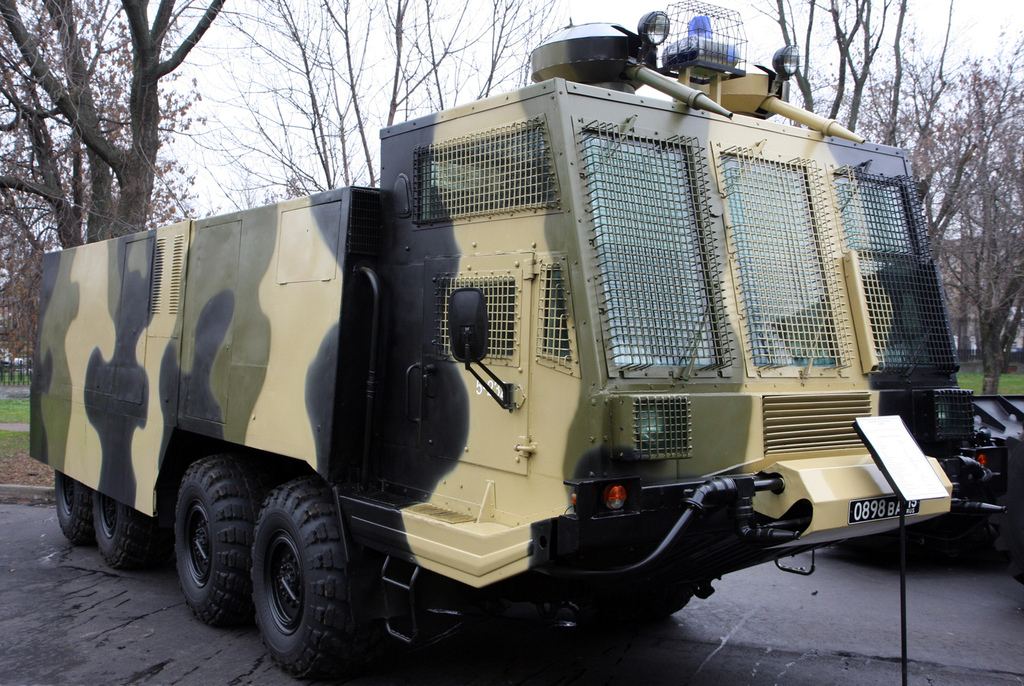
Internal Troops ABS-40 "Lavina" riot control water cannon on BAZ-6953 chassis

Internal Troops' equipment included:

=== Helicopters ===
- Mil Mi-6 Hook
- Mil Mi-8 Hip
- Mil Mi-24 Hind

=== Transportation ===
- BTR-80
- BTR-70
- BMP-2
- BRDM-2
- GAZ-2330 Tigr
- BPM-97
- GAZ Vodnik
- Ural-4320
- UAZ-469

=== Weaponry ===
- A wide variety of Soviet- and Russian-made small arms and crew-served weapons.

== Shoulder patches ==
Ministry of Internal Affairs	Troops of the Ministry of Internal Affairs	Internal Troops High Command	North-West District
North Caucasian District	Volga District	Ural District	Siberian District
Eastern District	Internal Security and Military Colleges	Separate Rapid Deployment Division (ODON)	Management of the Protection of Important Public Facilities and Special Cargo

== See also ==
- Awards of the Ministry of Internal Affairs of Russia
- National Guard of Russia
