= Vyacheslav Ovchinnikov (military officer) =

Russian military officer (born 1946)

- Вячеслав Овчинников
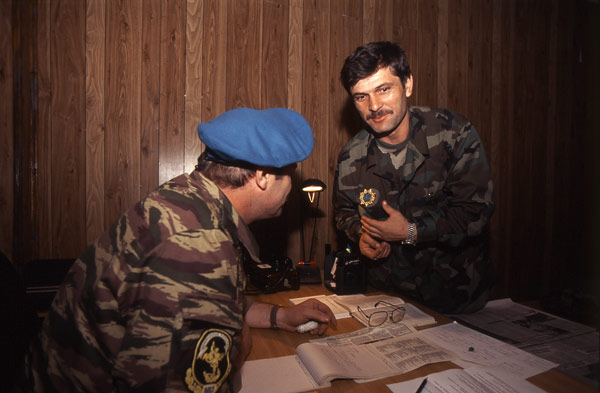
- Ovchinnikov examines the Order of Honor of the Nation of Aslambek Ismailov

Commander-in-Chief of the Internal Troops of Russia
- In office 5 April 1999 – 22 January 2000
- Preceded by: Pavel Maslov
- Succeeded by: Vyacheslav Tikhomirov

Chief of the Main Directorate for Correction of Punishments
- In office June 1997 – August 1998
- Preceded by: Yuri Kalinin
- Succeeded by: Vladimir Yalunin

Personal details
- Born: 8 March 1945 (age 81) Rasskazovo, Tambov Oblast, Soviet Union
- Education: Leningrad Higher Artillery Command School; Kalinin Military Artillery Academy; General Staff Military Academy

Military service
- Allegiance: Soviet Union; Russia
- Branch/service: Soviet Internal Troops; Russian Internal Troops
- Rank: Colonel general
- Unit: ODON
- Battles/wars: Soviet–Afghan War; Ossetian-Ingush conflict First Chechen War; War in Dagestan; Second Chechen War

Vyacheslav Viktorovich Ovchinnikov (Russian: Вячеслав Викторович Овчинников; born October 25, 1946, Rasskazovo, Tambov Oblast) is a senior official of the Ministry of Internal Affairs of the Russian Federation, Colonel General, and Doctor of Law.

== Biography ==
In 1968, he graduated from the Leningrad Higher Artillery Command School, having ranks in 11 sports, including: wave and Greco-Roman wrestling, sambo, kettlebells, skiing, boxing.

He graduated from the Kalinin Military Artillery Academy (1972–1976) and the Higher Academic Courses at the Military Academy of the General Staff of the Armed Forces of Russia (1995).

He defended his PhD dissertation on the topic: "Organizational and legal foundations of the activities of the internal affairs bodies and internal troops of the Ministry of Internal Affairs of Russia in conditions of internal armed conflicts".

In 2006, he defended his doctoral dissertation on the topic: "Interaction of law enforcement agencies and security forces of Russia in internal armed conflicts".

In 1968–1972, he served in the Dzerzhinsky Separate Operational Division, commanded a platoon, artillery battery, artillery division, in 1976-1988 - chief of staff and commander of an artillery regiment, commander of a convoy regiment.

He participated in the Soviet–Afghan War. In 1988-1990 he served as senior officer in the combat training department of the Main Directorate of Internal Troops of the USSR Ministry of Internal Affairs. From March 1990 he served as Chief of Staff of the Directorate of Internal Troops of the USSR Ministry of Internal Affairs for the North Caucasus and Transcaucasia. Since March 1993 he served as Deputy Chief of the Operations Department of the Main Directorate of the Commander of the Internal Troops of the Ministry of Internal Affairs of Russia.

He served as commandant of the emergency areas in Nagorno-Karabakh, the Ossetian-Ingush conflict, twice in Chechnya.

In 1995-1996 he served as Deputy Chief of Staff of the Ministry of Internal Affairs of Russia and since 1996 as the military commandant of Grozny. After the signing of the Khasavyurt Accords, he led the normalization of the situation in Grozny, including through the establishment of a joint patrol regime.

Since June 1997 he served as Chief of the Main Directorate for Correction of Punishments of the Ministry of Internal Affairs of Russia (GUIN). During Ovchinnikov's leadership of the GUIN, the process of transferring this structure from the Ministry of Internal Affairs to the Ministry of Justice took place, which was mostly completed by the fall of 1998.

From March 1999 he served as 1st Deputy Commander-in-Chief, from April of the same year Deputy Minister of Internal Affairs of the Russian Federation and Commander-in-Chief of the Internal Troops of the Ministry of Internal Affairs of Russia.

He participated in the War in Dagestan and the Second Chechen War. The concept of development of the internal troops for the period up to 2005 was developed under him. In January 2000, he was relieved of his post. He was in the active reserve until June 2007.

Since 2000 he is Advisor to the General Director of the Federal State Unitary Enterprise Rosoboronexport. He is a professor, member of several dissertation councils at the Academy of Management of the Ministry of Internal Affairs of Russia. In 1969 he joined the Communist Party of the Soviet Union.

== Awards ==
- Order of Courage
- Order of Military Merit
- Order "For Personal Courage"
- Order "For Service to the Homeland in the Armed Forces of the USSR"
- Jubilee Medal "In Commemoration of the 100th Anniversary of the Birth of Vladimir Ilyich Lenin"
- Medal "In Commemoration of the 850th Anniversary of Moscow"
- Medal "For Excellent Service in the Protection of Public Order"
- Jubilee Medal "50 Years of the Armed Forces of the USSR"
- Jubilee Medal "60 Years of the Armed Forces of the USSR"
- Jubilee Medal "70 Years of the Armed Forces of the USSR"
- Jubilee Medal "50 Years of the Soviet Militia"
- Medal "For Impeccable Service"
- Medal "200 years to the MVD of Russia"
- Medal "For Strengthening Military Cooperation"
