= Northwestern Order of the Red Star National Guard District =

District of Russia's National Guard

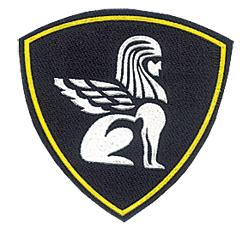
- Emblem for the District as it was under the Internal Troops, 2010
- Active: 15 July – 2 February 1939 (as CheKa Moscow District); 20 May 1943 – 7 May 1986 (as field Division); 7 May 1986 – present (as security command)
- Country: Russia
- Branch: National Guard of Russia
- Type: Gendarmerie
- Role: Internal security
- Part of: National Guard Forces Command
- Garrison/HQ: Moscow, st. Ivanteevskaya, 5

Commanders
- Current commander: Colonel general Aleksandr Popov

The Northwestern Order of the Red Star National Guard District is a district of the National Guard Forces Command of the Russian Federation.

It is commanded by General Pavel Dashkov who was appointed by decree of December 6, 2017, commander of the North-Western District of the National Guard of the Russian Federation.

== History ==
The predecessor 13th Department appears to have received the Order of the Red Star for exemplary performance in February 1968. It was reorganised as a division, the 42-я конвойная ордена Красной Звезды дивизия ВВ in December 1968.

The 44th Division was elevated into a district, with the 67th and 83rd Convoy Divisions and the 85th independent Brigade, in 1979.

In 1980 the predecessor Order of the Red Star Administration Northwestern Zone of the Internal Troops had the:

- 67th Convoy Division VV MVD (Arkhangelsk, Arkhangelsk Oblast)
- 83rd Convoy Division VV MVD (Syktyvkar, Komi ASSR)
- 85th independent Brigade VV MVD (Leningrad, Leningrad Oblast)
- 590th independent Escort Regiment (Murmansk, Murmansk Oblast - military unit: 6550)
- 613th independent Escort Regiment (Petrozavodsk, Karelian ASSR - military unit: 6545)

The 42nd Escort Division at Vilnius was reassigned to the Northwestern Zone in 1986.

Units listed in Russian Wikipedia as active within the district's boundaries include the 33rd Separate Operational Brigade of Special Designation (ru:33-я отдельная бригада оперативного назначения, в/ч 3526, Lebyazhye, Leningrad Oblast, which traces its origins to the formation of an NKVD cavalry regiment formed in Almaty in 1931); the 124th VV Regiment (в/ч 3705, Sosnovy Bor, Leningrad Oblast); and the 28th VV Special Purpose Detachment (ru:28-й отряд специального назначения «Ратник»).

Galeotti 2013 reported that the predecessor North-Western District of the Internal Troops may have also had the 63rd Separate Operational Brigade; 614th VV Regiment Koryazhma; 2nd Marine VV Detachment; 110th Separate Special Motorised Police Battalion, St Petersburg; 2nd Separate Special Motorised Police Battalion St Petersburg; and five other Special Motorised Police Battalions.
