= Pavel Maslov (military officer) =

Russian military leader (born 1946)

- Павел Маслов

Commander-in-Chief of the Internal Troops of Russia
- In office 9 May 1998 – 5 April 1999
- Preceded by: Leonty Shevtsov
- Succeeded by: Vyacheslav Ovchinnikov

Personal details
- Born: 10 October 1946 (age 79) Shakhty, Rostov Oblast, Soviet Union
- Education: Ulyanovsk Tank School; Malinovsky Military Armored Forces Academy; General Staff Military Academy

Military service
- Allegiance: Soviet Union; Russia
- Branch/service: Soviet Internal Troops; Russian Internal Troops
- Rank: Colonel general
- Battles/wars: First Chechen War

Pavel Tikhonovich Maslov (Russian: Павел Тихонович Маслов; born October 10, 1946, Shakhty, Rostov Oblast) is a Russian military leader, colonel general (1998) who served as the commander-in-chief of the Internal Troops of Russia.

== Biography ==
Born into a working-class family, his parents were from hereditary Cossack families. He graduated from high school in Shakhty in 1964.

In 1965 he was conscripted to the Soviet Armed Forces. In 1968, he graduated from the Ulyanovsk Lenin Guards Higher Tank Command School. Subsequently, he graduated from the Malinovsky Military Armored Forces Academy (1979) and the Voroshilov General Staff Military Academy (1991).

After graduating from military school in September 1968, he was sent for further service in the Group of Soviet Forces in Germany as a tank platoon commander and tank company commander in the 12th Guards Uman Tank Division.

In December 1973, Senior Lieutenant Maslov was transferred to the Leningrad Military District, where he served (with a break for study) until July 1989: tank company commander, battalion chief of staff, tank battalion commander, tank regiment commander from 1979, deputy commander from October 1984, then motorized rifle division commander.

In 1991, after graduating from the Military Academy of the General Staff, he was transferred to serve in the Internal Troops of the USSR Ministry of Internal Affairs. From July 1991, deputy chief of the Directorate of Internal Troops of the USSR Ministry of Internal Affairs for Western Siberia, from January 1993, deputy commander of the troops of the North Caucasus District of the Internal Troops of the Ministry of Internal Affairs of Russia for emergency areas and chief of the military operational group of the Ministry of Internal Affairs of Russia. From June 1994 he served as deputy chief of staff of the Internal Troops and chief of the operational department of the Main Directorate of Internal Troops.

From July 1995 he served as deputy Commander of the Internal Troops of the Ministry of Internal Affairs of Russia for Emergencies. In 1995, he was Deputy Commander of the United Group of Federal Troops in Chechnya. He participated in the First Chechen War.

From January 1996 he served as chief of staff of the Internal Troops and first deputy Commander-in-Chief of the Internal Troops of the Ministry of Internal Affairs of Russia. From January 27, 1997 he served as First Deputy Minister of Internal Affairs of the Russian Federation and Chief of the General Staff of the Ministry of Internal Affairs of Russia.

After the resignation of Anatoly Kulikov, from March 23 to March 30, 1998, he temporarily served as Acting Minister of Internal Affairs of the Russian Federation, and was relieved of his duties as Deputy Minister of Internal Affairs at his own request.

On May 9, 1998, he was appointed Deputy Minister of Internal Affairs of the Russian Federation and Commander-in-Chief of the Internal Troops of Russia. He commanded the troops for less than a year and was relieved of his post on April 5, 1999. On the same day, he was discharged into the reserve.

He was the Chairman of the Council of Veterans of the Main Command of the Internal Troops of the Ministry of Internal Affairs of Russia in 2006-2008.

== Awards ==
- Order of Courage
- Order "For Service to the Homeland in the Armed Forces of the USSR"
- Medal "Veteran of the Armed Forces of the USSR"
- Jubilee Medal "50 Years of the Armed Forces of the USSR"
- Jubilee Medal "60 Years of the Armed Forces of the USSR"
- Jubilee Medal "70 Years of the Armed Forces of the USSR"
- Medal "For Impeccable Service"
