= National Guard Forces Command =

Law enforcement branch of the Russian National Guard

National Guard Forces Command of the Russian Federation Войска национальной гвардии Российской Федерации Voyska Natsional'noy Gvardii Rossiyskoy Federatsii
- Patch of the troops

- Badge of the National Guard Forces Command

- Flag of the National Guard Forces Command
- Common name: National Guard Troops

Agency overview
- Formed: 5 April 2016
- Preceding agencies: Special Corps of Gendarmes; Internal Troops of Russia
- Employees: estimated 185,000 personnel
- Annual budget: 22,999,000

Jurisdictional structure
- Federal agency (Operations jurisdiction): RUS
- Operations jurisdiction: RUS
- Population: 145 million
- Legal jurisdiction: Russian Federation
- Primary governing body: Security Council of Russia
- Secondary governing body: National Guard of Russia
- General nature: Federal law enforcement; Gendarmerie; Civilian police

Operational structure
- Overseen by: President of Russia through the Commander of the National Guard
- Headquarters: Moscow
- Agency executive: Army General Viktor Zolotov, Commander of the NGFC (in concurrent capacity as Commander of the Federal National Guard Service)
- Parent agency: Security Council of Russia thru the National Guard of Russia (federal agency)
- Child agencies: Kadyrovites; National Guard Naval Service Corps

Notables
- Significant operation: Conducting anti-terrorism operations, borders control, combating illegal weapons trade, public order
- Anniversary: April 5 March 27, anniversary of the Internal Guards Corps

Website
- rosguard.gov.ru

The National Guard Forces Command of the Russian Federation (Russian: Войска национальной гвардии Российской Федерации, romanized: Voyska Natsionalnoy Gvardii Rossiyskoi Federatsii, lit. 'Troops of the National Guard of the Russian Federation') is the operational gendarmerie component of the National Guard of Russia federal agency, created through a presidential decree on April 5, 2016. Functionally, it is a gendarmerie organized along paramilitary lines with a mission to ensure public order, national security and defense against terrorism. To this end, Forces Command handles the operational units of the National Guard, including its rapid deployment branch, the Separate Operational Purpose Division (ODON); and its naval branch, the National Guard Naval Service Corps (not to be confused with the Russian Coast Guard, which is under the authority of the Border Service of the Federal Security Service of the Russian Federation).

It is the main successor of the Special Corps of Gendarmes and the Internal Troops of Russia.

== History of the NGF ==
=== Imperial Oprichnina ===
From 1565 to 1572 the Oprichnina and its agents, the oprichniki, served, under the behest of Tsar Ivan IV, as the first ever police service in Russia with a national focus. Their missions were mass repressions, public executions, and confiscation of land from Russian aristocrats and their families. They served primarily as a secret police service reporting to the Tsar's office.

=== Police dragoons ===
The first example of internal security troops in Russia are the police dragoons established during the reign of Peter the Great. As early as 1763 police dragoon units were raised in both Moscow and Saint Petersburg as part of their police forces. Regulations made on 24 February [O.S. 12 February] 1802, 20 June [O.S. 8 June] 1804 and 7 March [O.S. 23 February] 1806 standardized the size of the police dragoons as:

- St. Petersburg – 45 NCOs, 264 other ranks and 5 reserves
- Moscow – 60 NCOs, 240 other ranks, 6 reserves

=== Garrison Forces of the Imperial Russian Army ===
Peter the Great's other legacy to Russian law enforcement were the Imperial Russian Army's Military Garrison Forces. Raised in 1701 the Garrison Forces – of battalion or squadron size, plus 4 dragoon regiments of special use – served as a military police force not just for the military bases but for the communities nearest them.

=== Internal Guards ===
Today's National Guard Forces Command traces their lineage and heritages from the Internal Guards Gendarmerie units, established in 1811 and tasked with public security, rear area defense and police duties, and the Gendarmerie Regiment of the Imperial Russian Army, raised in 1815 with the re-designation of the Borisoglebsk Dragoon Regiment which served in Napoleon's invasion of Russia in 1812.

The Internal Guards Corps were founded by an Ukaz of Emperor Alexander I on 29 January [O.S. 17 January] 1811 and 8 April [O.S. 27 March] 1811, officially disbanding the police dragoon troops and the paramilitary police formations, plus military garrison battalions and/or squadrons under the Imperial Army, which were reorganized into Internal Guards brigades and districts, all under the leadership of Adjutant General Yevgraf Fedotovich Komarovskiy, its first commander. The aforementioned decree approved the "Regulations for the Internal Guard", according to which the guard was mandated to aid in public order and security and help enforce law and order and the judicial process, as well as in firefighting.

Meanwhile, the need for and benefits of mounted troops as part of the service presented the government with the formation of personnel, even as the French 1812 invasion of Russia interrupted its work. Based on that assumption, and as it turned out on the experience of disadvantage depending on the civil authorities of military commands in the years after the war, the Police Dragoons, now the Gendarmerie of the Internal Guards Corps, were reactivated in 1817.

By 1817, the Internal Guards units and the Gendarmerie evolved into a national organization with units all over the Empire, and with the growing power and duties of the Internal Guards, the office of Chief of Gendarmes, tasked to manage the organization, was created in 1826, and the Gendarmerie units nationwide were, together with the Internal Guards themselves, in 1827 were integrated into the new Special Corps of Gendarmes, with its organization always changing as per regulations made in 1836–37. (At the same time the Third Section of His Imperial Majesty's Own Chancellery was established, but it was starting 1837 that the Chief of Gendarmes also assumed concurrent duties as its chairman.) Personnel were either retired or reserve Army personnel or had separate training within command headquarters, the military heritage was also seen in its military ranks and military styled uniforms. In 1842 the IRA's Gendarmerie Regiment was transferred to this organization.

A separate command for the railways was raised in 1846, originally the Reserve Squadron. By 1881 the 3rd Section was transformed into the Okhrana, and several personnel of the SCG moved to the new organization.

=== From USSR Internal Troops to the establishment of the National Guard ===
By 1917 both the SCG and Okhrana were disbanded after the February Revolution because of their links to the Imperial Family and government institutions.

The modern Internal Troops were raised by the All-Russian Central Executive Committee as part of the NKVD in 1918, and was reorganized in 1919 unto the Internal Security Forces (Voyska vnutrenney okhrany Respubliki, VOHR). In 1919, these were transferred to the Cheka and in 1922–23 into the OGPU. By 1925 the OGPU and the VOHR personnel entered the Soviet Armed Forces, and in 1934 the OGPU was fused into the NKVD again, making its Internal Troops as a joint NKVD-NKO controlled service branch.

On 28 July 1988, the Presidium of the Supreme Soviet issued a decree "On duties and rights of the Internal Troops of the USSR MVD when safeguarding public order", clarifying its role in the cracking USSR. However, the Internal Troops were still a part of the Soviet Armed Forces and this state of affairs pleased no one. The Armed Forces did not want to be seen as a force of internal suppression, especially after the disastrous Afghan War. The MVD was finding itself having to extinguish increasingly frequent and violent hot spots and to cope with growing and increasingly well organised and equipped criminals. For this the MVD needed more fire power. On 21 March 1989, the Presidium decided to take the Internal Troops out of the Armed Forces and the Ministry of Defense and give them to the Internal Affairs Ministry, ending a 55-year partnership between the two ministries.

In 1990, the establishment of the RSFSR MVD meant that the Internal Troops in the Russian SFSR were now subordinated to the republican ministry.

With the April 2016 foundation of the National Guard, the IT became the National Guard Forces (Войска национальной гвардии, Voyska Natsionalnoy Gvardii) and now reports directly to the Security Council and its chairman, the President of Russia, and thus removed from the MVD proper.

== Legal basis ==
On 6 April 2016, President Putin submitted to the State Duma lower house of parliament of the Federal Assembly the draft framework law for this new executive body titled "On the Russian National Guard Troops" along with its corresponding amendments that contains a provision for the protection of pregnant women, children, disabled persons and crowds that states:

It shall be prohibited to use firearms against women with the visible signs of pregnancy, people with the apparent signs of disability and underage persons, except for the cases when such persons put up armed resistance, make an assault involving a group of attackers or commit another attack threatening the life and health of citizens or a National Guard serviceman, and it shall also be prohibited to use firearms at largely crowded places, if their use may casually hurt people.

The NGF, as legal successor to the SCG and IT-MIA, is mandated as a paramilitary gendarmerie at the national level.

== Structure ==
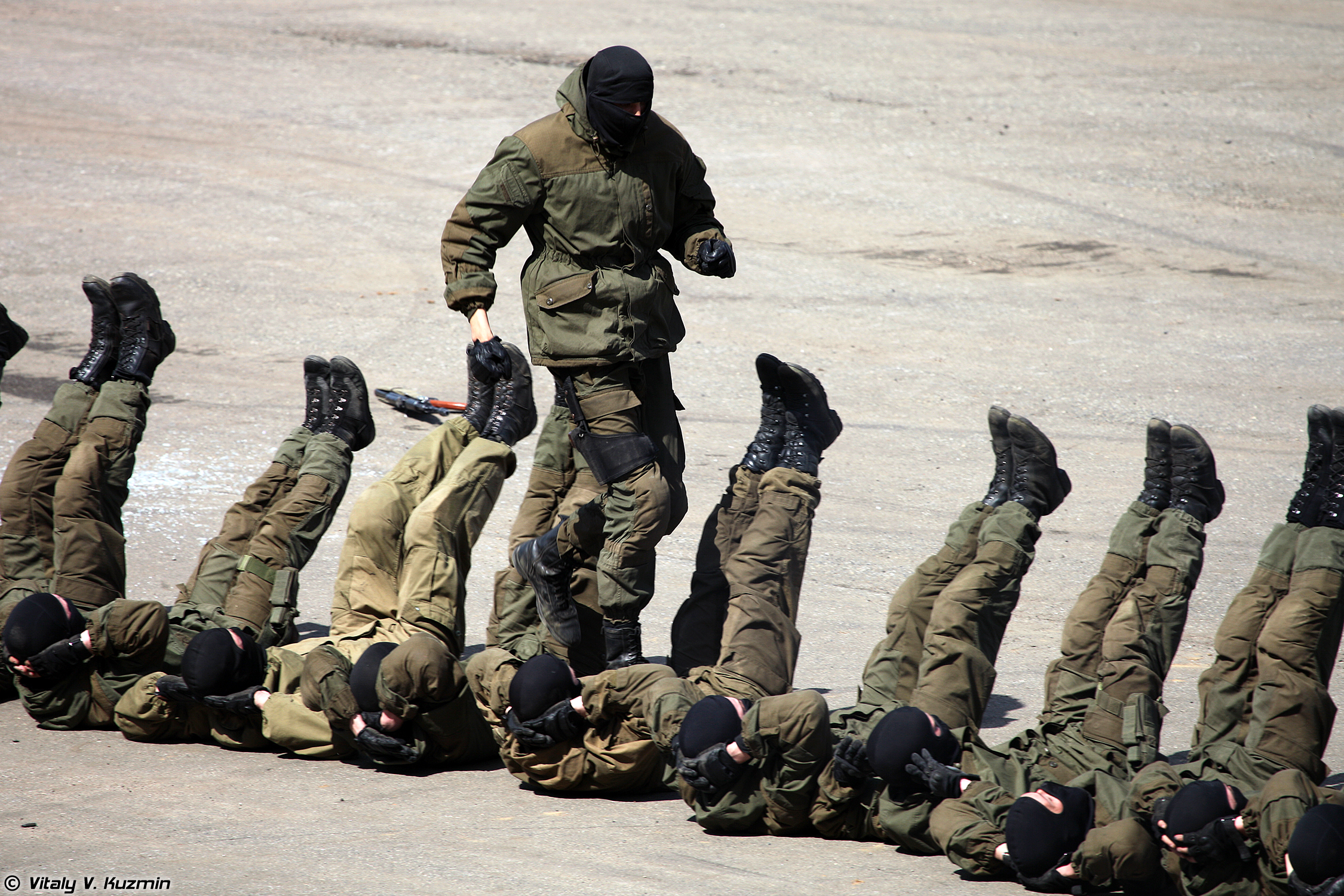
Military personnel of the Russian National Guard 33rd Special Purpose Detachment "Peresvet" during a public show in 2017

Today's NGF is a paramilitary force with centralized system of ranks, command and service, and as such reports to the National Guard of Russia and the Security Council of Russia. Majority of the officer corps were trained in both special academies of the former MVD Internal Troops and the Armed Forces's military academies. Other ranks include a mix of both conscripted national servicemen and volunteer servicemen.

The main kinds of NGF units are field units, various facility-guarding units (except in prisons), special motorized units, riot control and patrol units, and special forces like Rus. Since the 1980s, the several spetsnaz (special purpose) units were created within the former VV to deal with terrorism and hostage crises. Fields units were essentially light motorized infantry, similar to respective regular army units by their organization and weapons. They and the special forces have been heavily engaged in the armed conflicts in Chechnya and the broader North Caucasus.

=== Districts and formations ===
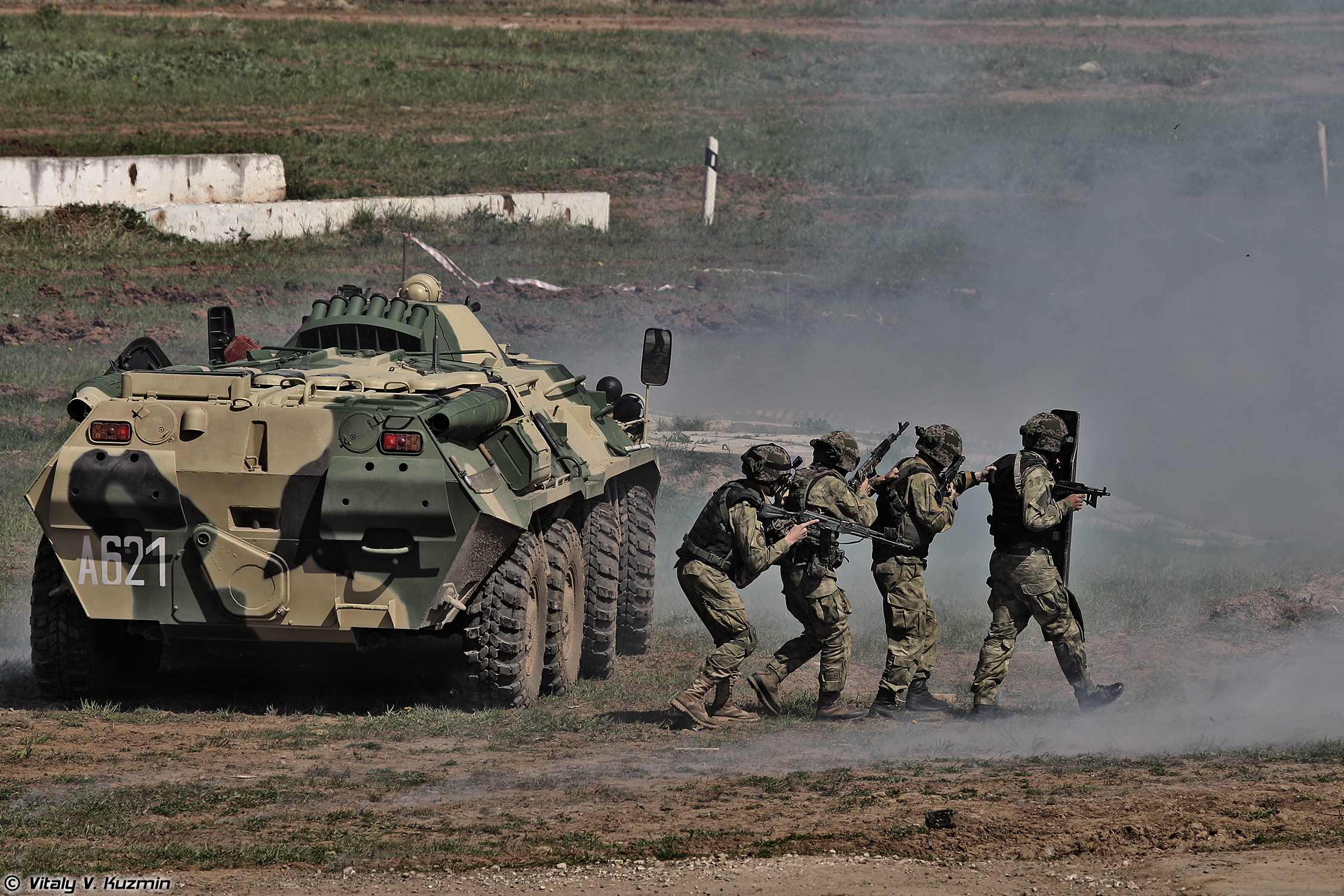
Military personnel of the Russian National Guard 604th Special Purpose Center "Vityaz" with support of BTR-80 during a training exercise to assault a building in 2017

The NGF comprises headquarters, military units, military training institutions and the institutions for National Guard Forces activities, and maintenance and administration bodies. The largest units are located in all major cities.

NGF regional commands:

- Northwestern Order of the Red Star National Guard District
- Central Orshansko-Hingansky Order of the Red Banner District Command
- North Caucasus District Command
- Volga District Command
- Ural District Command
- Siberian District Command
- Eastern District Command

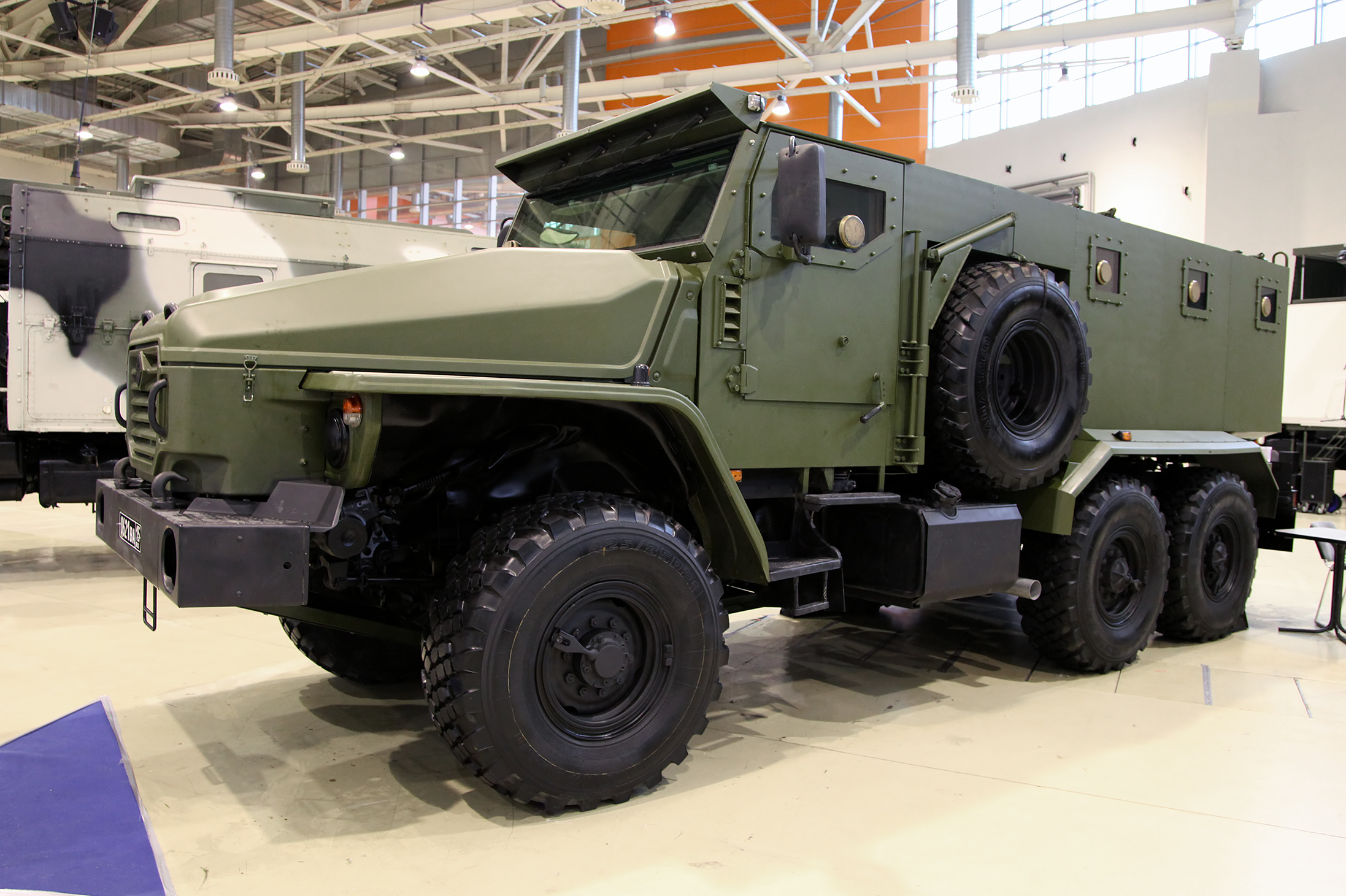
Ural-VV armored vehicle, designed on the basis of a multi-purpose vehicle Ural-4320 6 × 6 chassis

Military units under direct subordination:

- A separate rapid deployment division (ODON). This formation, also known as the Dzerzhinsky Division and based near Moscow, was the most well-known formation of the Internal Troops, and now falls under the NGF.
- The Central Communications
- Engineering Center
- Intelligence Directorate NGF under the Intelligence Chief-Deputy Chief of Staff of the National Guard Forces
- St. Petersburg National Guard Forces Command Military Institute

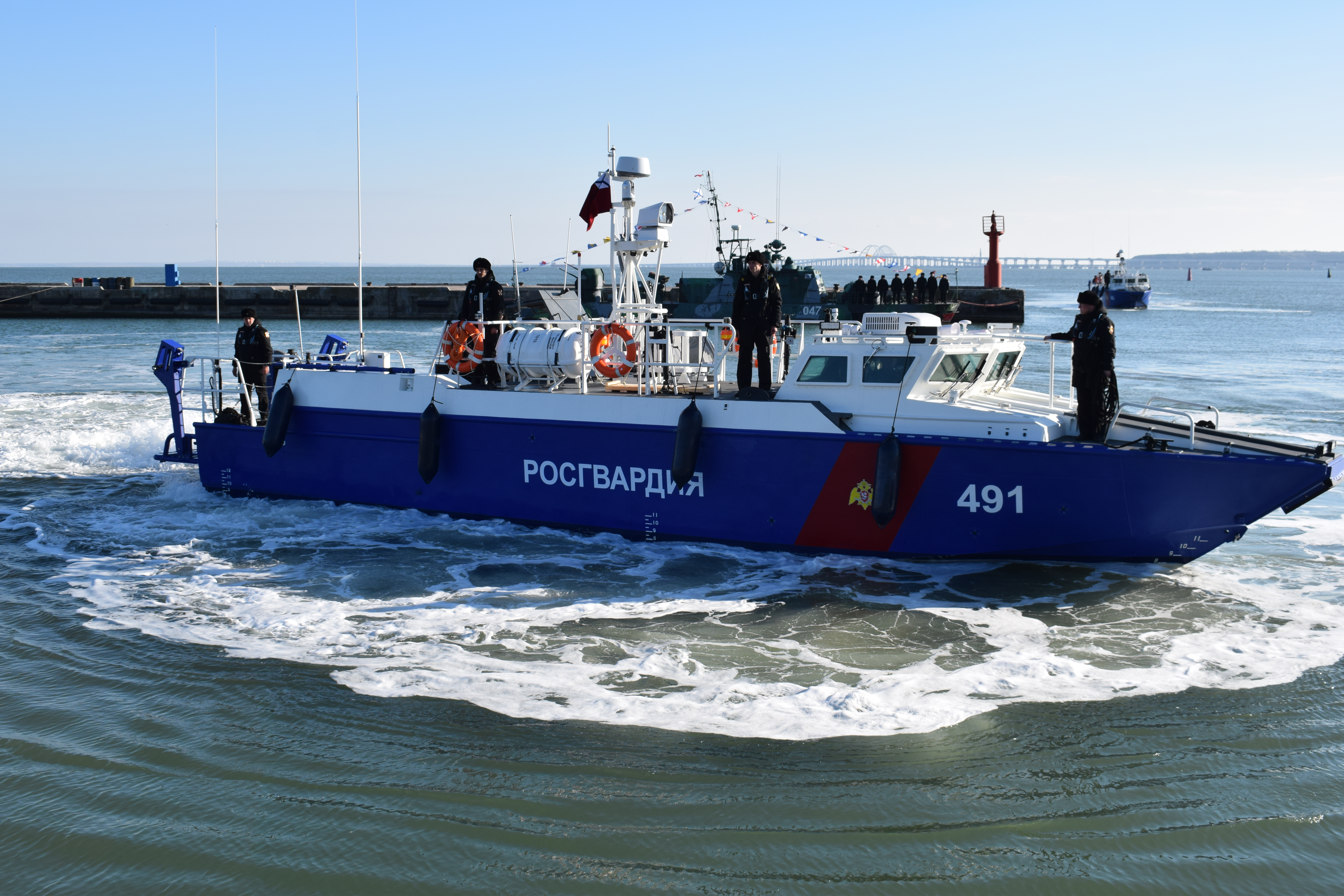
Russian National Guard BK-16-class landing craft at the Crimean Bridge in 2019

The NGFC also controls 5 naval units operating in coastal and inland waters under the banner of the National Guard Naval Service Corps (formerly the Naval Service of the Internal Troops of Russia, raised 1978, including personnel of the National Guard Naval Diving Service founded in 1987).

=== St. Petersburg National Guard Forces Command Military Institute ===
Located in St. Petersburg, the National Guard Forces Command Military Institute serves as the training facility for personnel of the National Guard Forces Command of the National Guard of Russia, including officers, warrant officers and non-commissioned officers. It was established on September 4, 1947 as the MVD Central School and since then as gone on many transformations before acquiring its present title in 2016.

== Missions ==
- Security – to guard "key" state institutions (except for the Kremlin and the highest echelons of the government which are guarded by the Federal Protective Service (FSO)), nuclear facilities, special storage depots and military bases.
- National defence – to conduct rear area security operations and all military operations within national borders, counter-intelligence authority in wartime.
- Public order – to assist the Russian Police for riot control operations when the National Guard's OMON units are not available.
- Border control – to assist the Border Service of the FSB in the protection of the State border of the Russian Federation.
- Counter-terrorist operations (Ex-VV special forces units such as Vityaz and Rus).
- Possible counterweight to the regular armed forces, especially during wartime periods as may be called by the President in his duty as Supreme Commander of the Armed Forces and Chairman of the Security Council, through the Commander of the National Guard.

== See also ==
- National Guard of Russia
