= Lebyazhye, Nizhnedevitsky District, Voronezh Oblast =

Lebyazhye Лебяжье
- Selo
- Location within Voronezh Oblast Location within Russia
- Coordinates: 51°19′N 38°20′E
- Country: Russia
- Region: Voronezh Oblast
- District: Nizhnedevitsky District
- Time zone: UTC+3:00

Lebyazhye (Russian: Лебяжье) is a rural locality (a selo) in Sinelipyagovskoye Rural Settlement, Nizhnedevitsky District, Voronezh Oblast, Russia. The population was 63 as of 2010.

== Geography ==
Lebyazhye is located 33 km south of Nizhnedevitsk (the district's administrative centre) by road. Dmitriyevsky is the nearest rural locality.
