= Lebyazhye, Volgograd Oblast =

Lebyazhye Лебяжье
- Selo
- Location within Volgograd Oblast Location within Russia
- Coordinates: 50°10′N 45°12′E
- Country: Russia
- Region: Volgograd Oblast
- District: Kamyshinsky District
- Time zone: UTC+4:00

Lebyazhye (Russian: Лебяжье) is a rural locality (a selo) and the administrative center of Lebyazhenskoye Rural Settlement, Kamyshinsky District, Volgograd Oblast, Russia. The population was 1,695 as of 2010. There are 9 streets.

== Geography ==
Lebyazhye is located in steppe, on the Volga Upland, on the left bank of the Ilovlya River, 30 km northwest of Kamyshin (the district's administrative centre) by road. Petrov Val is the nearest rural locality.
