= Lebyazhye, Barnaul, Altai Krai =

Lebyazhye Лебяжье
- Selo
- Location within Altai Krai Location within Russia
- Coordinates: 53°14′N 83°39′E
- Country: Russia
- Region: Altai Krai
- District: Barnaul
- Time zone: UTC+7:00

Lebyazhye (Russian: Лебяжье) is a rural locality (a selo) in Barnaul, Altai Krai, Russia. The population was 5,484 as of 2013. There are 34 streets.

== Geography ==
Lebyazhye is located 17 km southwest of Barnaul by road. Yuzhny is the nearest rural locality.
