= Lebyazhy, Republic of Bashkortostan =

Lebyazhy Лебяжий
- Selo
- Location within Bashkortostan Location within Russia
- Coordinates: 54°38′N 55°55′E
- Country: Russia
- Region: Bashkortostan
- District: Ufimsky District
- Time zone: UTC+5:00

Lebyazhy (Russian: Лебяжий) is a rural locality (a selo) in Zubovsky Selsoviet, Ufimsky District, Bashkortostan, Russia. The population was 290 as of 2010. There are 13 streets.

== Geography ==
Lebyazhy is located 14 km south of Ufa (the district's administrative centre) by road. Tsvety Bashkirii is the nearest rural locality.
