= Lebyazhye, Pavlovsky District, Altai Krai =

Lebyazhye Лебяжье
- Village
- Location within Altai Krai Location within Russia
- Coordinates: 53°08′N 82°47′E
- Country: Russia
- Region: Altai Krai
- District: Pavlovsky District
- Time zone: UTC+7:00

Lebyazhye (Russian: Лебяжье) is a rural locality (a selo) and the administrative center of Lebyazhensky Selsoviet of Pavlovsky District, Altai Krai, Russia. The population was 1,019 in 2016. There are 17 streets.

== Geography ==
Lebyazhye is located 30 km southwest of Pavlovsk (the district's administrative centre) by road. Imeni Mamontova is the nearest rural locality.
