= Lebyazhye, Pervomaysky District, Altai Krai =

Lebyazhye Лебяжье
- Selo
- Location within Altai Krai Location within Russia
- Coordinates: 53°50′N 84°08′E
- Country: Russia
- Region: Altai Krai
- District: Pervomaysky District
- Time zone: UTC+7:00

Lebyazhye (Russian: Лебяжье) is a rural locality (a selo) in Severny Selsoviet, Pervomaysky District, Altai Krai, Russia. The population was 236 as of 2013. There are 2 streets.

== Geography ==
Lebyazhye is located 80 km north of Novoaltaysk (the district's administrative centre) by road. Zhuravlikha and Severny are the nearest rural localities.
