= Lebyazhsky District =

Lebyazhsky District Лебяжский район (Russian)
- District
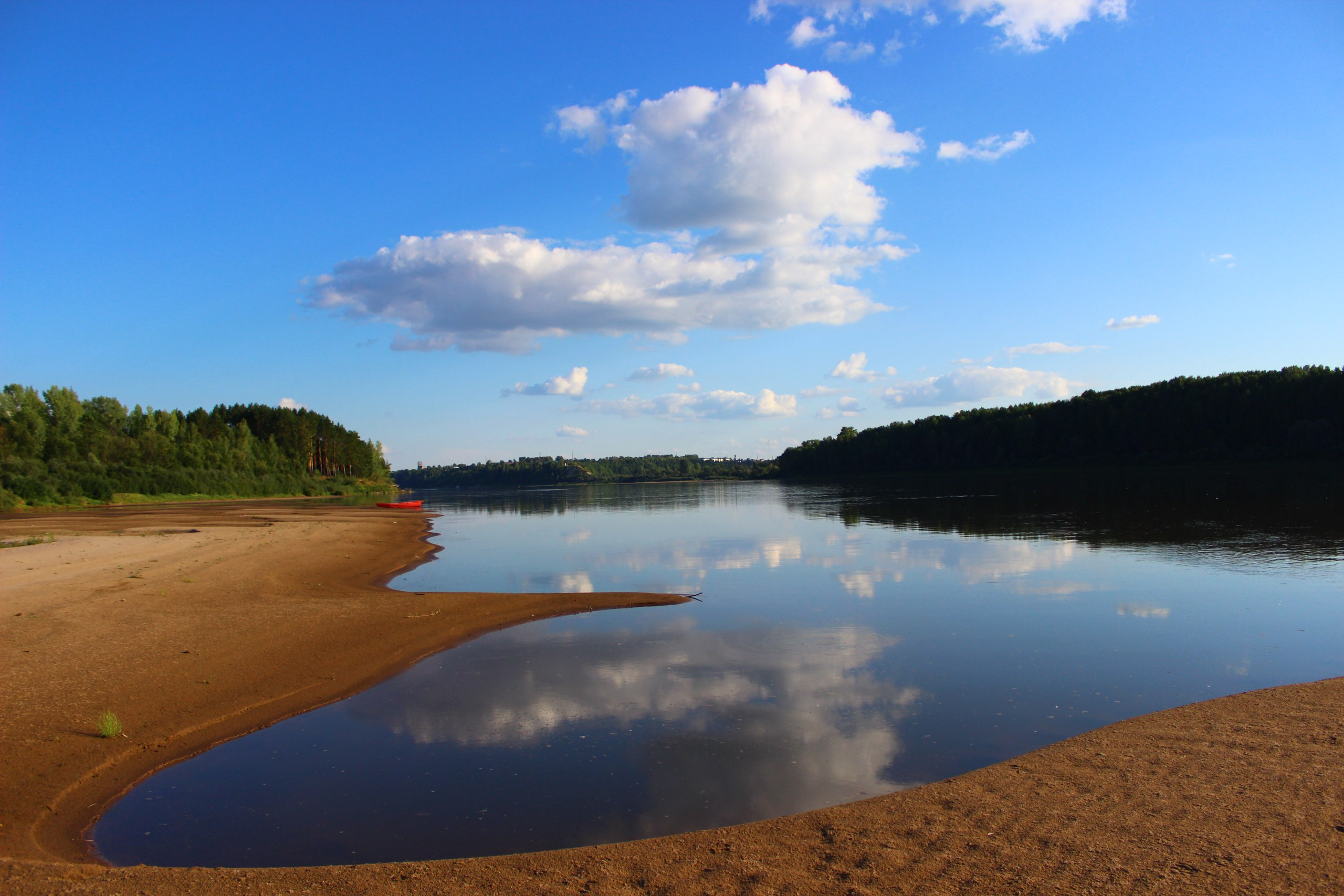
- Banks of Vyatka River, Lebyazhsky District

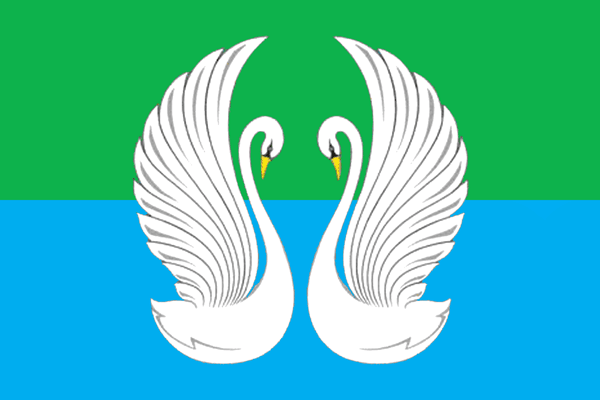
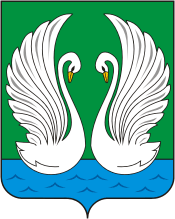
- Flag Coat of arms
- Location of Lebyazhsky District in Kirov Oblast
- Coordinates: 57°24′34″N 49°32′22″E
- Country: Russia
- Federal subject: Kirov Oblast
- Administrative center: Lebyazhye

Area
  - Total: 1,336 km^{2} (516 sq mi)

Population (2010 Census)
  - Total: 8,700
  - Density: 6.5/km^{2} (17/sq mi)
  - Urban: 38.6%
  - Rural: 61.4%

Administrative structure
  - Administrative divisions: 1 Urban-type settlements, 3 Rural okrugs
  - Inhabited localities: 1 urban-type settlements, 64 rural localities

Municipal structure
  - Municipally incorporated as: Lebyazhsky Municipal District
  - Municipal divisions: 1 urban settlements, 3 rural settlements
- Time zone: UTC+3 (MSK)
- OKTMO ID: 33621000
- Website: http://lebyazhe43.ru/

Lebyazhsky District (Russian: Лебя́жский райо́н) is an administrative and municipal district (raion), one of the thirty-nine in Kirov Oblast, Russia. It is located in the south of the oblast. The area of the district is 1,336 square kilometers (516 sq mi). Its administrative center is the urban locality (an urban-type settlement) of Lebyazhye. Population: 8,700 (2010 census); 11,176 (2002 Census); 12,414 (1989 Soviet census). The population of Lebyazhye accounts for 38.6% of the district's total population.
