= Dobrino, Voronezh Oblast =

Dobrino Добрино
- Selo
- Location within Voronezh Oblast Location within Russia
- Coordinates: 51°13′N 39°31′E
- Country: Russia
- Region: Voronezh Oblast
- District: Liskinsky District
- Time zone: UTC+3:00

Dobrino (Russian: Добрино) is a rural locality (a selo) in Tresorukovskoye Rural Settlement, Liskinsky District, Voronezh Oblast, Russia. The population was 496 as of 2010. There are 6 streets.

== Geography ==
Dobrino is located 35 km north of Liski (the district's administrative centre) by road. Tresorukovo is the nearest rural locality.
