= Lebyazhye, Ramonsky District, Voronezh Oblast =

Lebyazhye Лебяжье
- Selo
- Location within Voronezh Oblast Location within Russia
- Coordinates: 51°59′N 38°51′E
- Country: Russia
- Region: Voronezh Oblast
- District: Ramonsky District
- Time zone: UTC+3:00

Lebyazhye (Russian: Лебяжье) is a rural locality (a selo) in Pavlovskoye Rural Settlement, Ramonsky District, Voronezh Oblast, Russia. The population was 207 as of 2010. There are 4 streets.

== Geography ==
Lebyazhye is located on the Bolshaya Vereyka River, 45 km northwest of Ramon (the district's administrative centre) by road. Gremyachye is the nearest rural locality.
