= Lebyazhye, Kamyzyaksky District, Astrakhan Oblast =

Lebyazhye Лебяжье
- Selo
- Location within Astrakhan Oblast Location within Russia
- Coordinates: 45°54′N 48°07′E
- Country: Russia
- Region: Astrakhan Oblast
- District: Kamyzyaksky District
- Time zone: UTC+4:00

Lebyazhye (Russian: Лебяжье) is a rural locality (a selo) in Obrastsovo-Travinsky Selsoviet, Kamyzyaksky District, Astrakhan Oblast, Russia. The population was 732 as of 2010. There are 4 streets.

== Geography ==
Lebyazhye is located 36 km south of Kamyzyak (the district's administrative centre) by road. Nikolayevsky is the nearest rural locality.
