= Lebyazhye, Kirov Oblast =

Lebyazhye Лебяжье
- Urban-type settlement
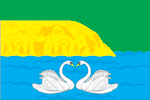
- Flag
- Interactive map of Lebyazhye
- Location of Lebyazhye Lebyazhye (Kirov Oblast)
- Coordinates: 57.4099°N 49.5277°E
- Country: Russia
- Federal subject: Kirov Oblast
- Administrative district: Lebyazhsky District
- Founded: 1605

Population (2010 Census)
  - Total: 3,362
  - Estimate (2025): 2,656 (−21%)
- Time zone: UTC+3 (MSK)
- Postal code: 613500
- OKTMO ID: 33621151051

Lebyazhye (Russian: Лебяжье) is an urban locality (an urban-type settlement) in Lebyazhsky District of Kirov Oblast, Russia. Population: 3,362 (2010 census); 3,571 (2002 census); 3,829 (1989 Soviet census).
