= Lebyazhy, Volgograd Oblast =

Lebyazhy Лебяжий
- Khutor
- Location within Volgograd Oblast Location within Russia
- Coordinates: 49°31′N 43°24′E
- Country: Russia
- Region: Volgograd Oblast
- District: Serafimovichsky District
- Time zone: UTC+4:00

Lebyazhy (Russian: Лебяжий) is a rural locality (a khutor) in Kletsko-Pochtovskoye Rural Settlement, Serafimovichsky District, Volgograd Oblast, Russia. The population was 3 as of 2010.

== Geography ==
Lebyazhy is located 92 km southeast of Serafimovich (the district's administrative centre) by road. Vyezdinsky is the nearest rural locality.
