= Lebyazhye, Amur Oblast =

Lebyazhye Лебяжье
- Selo
- Location within Amur Oblast Location within Russia
- Coordinates: 50°58′N 128°09′E
- Country: Russia
- Region: Amur Oblast
- District: Seryshevsky District
- Time zone: UTC+9:00

Lebyazhye (Russian: Лебяжье) is a rural locality (a selo) and the administrative center of Lebyazhyevsky Selsoviet of Seryshevsky District, Amur Oblast, Russia. The population was 365 as of 2018. There are 4 streets.

== Geography ==
Lebyazhye is located on the Tom River, 26 km southwest of Seryshevo (the district's administrative centre) by road. Belousovka is the nearest rural locality.
