= Commemorative Medal "Participant of a Special Military Operation" =

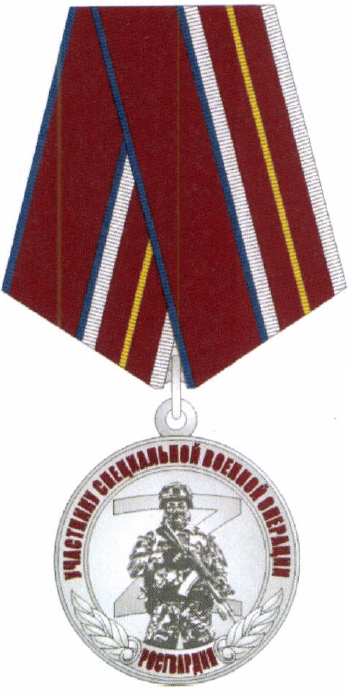
- Obverse of the medal
- Type: Campaign medal
- Awarded for: Service during the Russo-Ukrainian War
- Country: Russia
- Presented by: National Guard of the Russian Federation
- Campaign: Russo-Ukrainian War
- Established: 26 May 2022
- Ribbon of the medal

The Commemorative Medal "Participant of a Special Military Operation" (Russian: Памятная медаль «Участнику специальной военной операции») is a campaign medal of the National Guard of the Russian Federation. By order of the Federal Service of the National Guard Troops of the Russian Federation dated May 26, 2022, No. 170, a commemorative medal “Participant in a Special Military Operation” was established; the document was registered by the Ministry of Justice of the Russian Federation and published on June 27, 2022.

== Description ==
The medal consists of a medal base and a pentagonal base. The medal base is made of nickel silver and is circular, silver-colored, with a raised border on both sides. The diameter is 32 millimeters. The medal's base is attached to a rectangular base with an eyelet and a ring, which is covered with a moiré ribbon of a maroon color. The left half of the ribbon is bordered by blue stripes (each 1 millimeter wide), and the right half by white stripes (each 2 millimeter wide). A yellow stripe (1 millimeter wide) is placed in the center of the right half of the ribbon. The width of the ribbon is 24 millimeters.

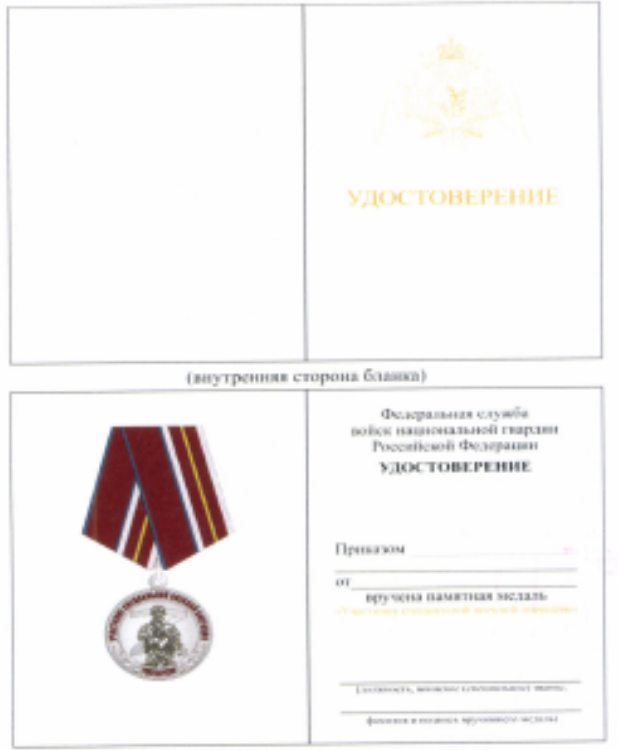
Certificate

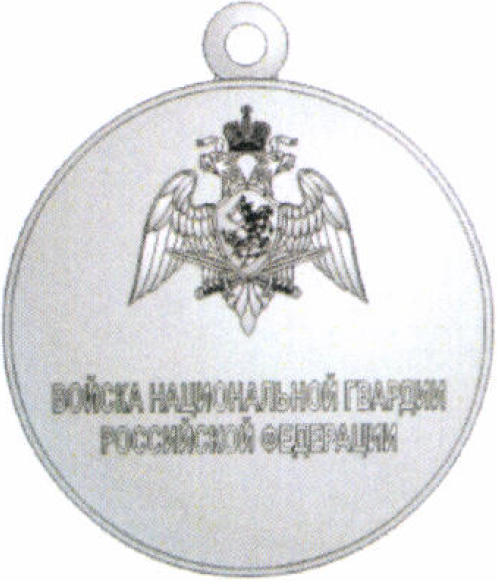
Reverse Medal

=== Obverse ===
The obverse of the medal features a silver stylized image of a serviceman with a machine gun against a background of a silver ribbon folded in three to form the letter Z. Above the image is a semicircle of the inscription in maroon:

"TO A PARTICIPANT IN A SPECIAL MILITARY OPERATION ." Below the image is a semicircle of laurel wreath entwined with a ribbon bearing the inscription in maroon: "ROSGVARDIYA".

=== Reverse ===
On the reverse of the medal, in the upper part, there is an image of a heraldic sign - the emblem of the troops of the National Guard of the Russian Federation, in the lower part in two lines there is an inscription "TROOPS OF THE NATIONAL GUARD OF THE RUSSIAN FEDERATION".
