= National Guard Day (Russia) =

Holiday in Russia

Day of the National Guard Troops of the Russian Federation
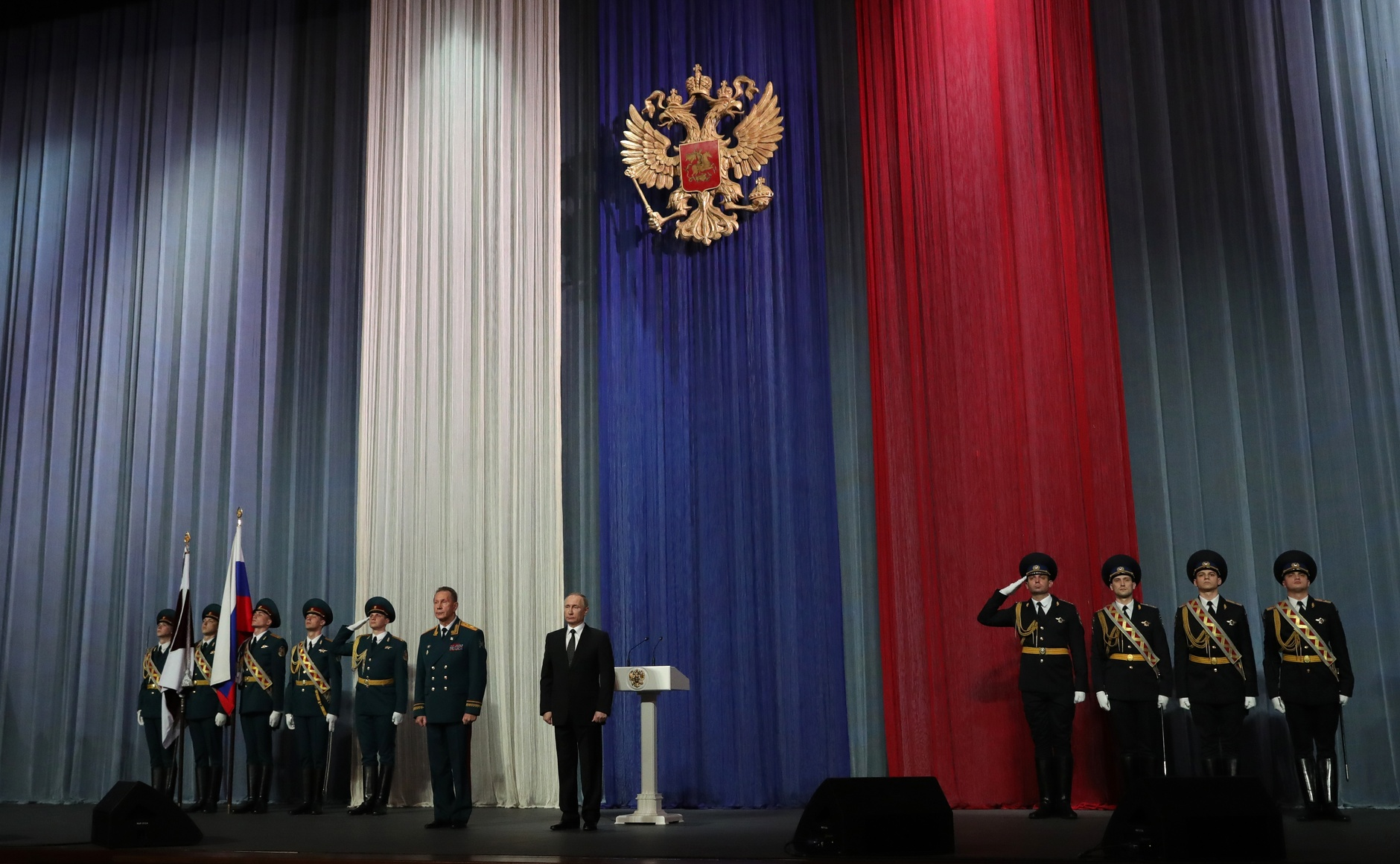
- The Kremlin reception in 2017.
- Official name: День войск национальной гвардии Российской Федерации
- Observed by: Russia
- Type: Local
- Celebrations: Parades throughout the city, Fireworks
- Date: 27 March
- Next time: 27 March 2025
- Frequency: annual

National Guard Day (Russian: День войск национальной гвардии) is an official holiday that honors the National Guard of Russia, celebrated on 27 March.

== History ==
On 16 January 2017, President Vladimir Putin issued a decree establishing 27 March as the Day of the National Guard. From 1996 to 2016, this day was celebrated as the Day of Internal Troops of Russia. The Day of Internal Troops was established by President Boris Yeltsin on 19 March 1996. The celebration of the Day of Internal Troops is historically liked to several decrees of Tsar Alexander I on the reorganization of the garrison units of the army and the creation of the Internal Guard. One of the final decrees, dated 27 March (8 April in the Gregorian calendar), 1811, marked the organization of the first Internal Guard.

== Traditions ==
On this day, the command of the Russian Guard gives military personnel, employees with special police ranks and civilian personnel awards, gives thanks, assigns military and special ranks. Greetings are extended by the President of Russia.

=== Celebrations ===
Every year on 27 March in Moscow, the Commander-in-Chief of the National Guard lays a wreath at the monument to Alexander I. In Moscow, on Krasnokazarmennaya Street, generals and officers of the Rosgvardia lay flowers at the monument to the Internal Troops. The same ceremonial events take place in other cities, where military units are deployed. During a gala concert in the Grand Kremlin Palace in 2017, President Vladimir Putin presented the banner of the National Guard to the Director of the National Guard, Army General Viktor Zolotov.

== See also ==
- Public holidays in Russia
- Defender of the Fatherland Day
- Victory Day (9 May)
- Russia Day
