= Ekaterina Schulmann =

Russian political scientist (born 1978)

- Екатерина Шульман
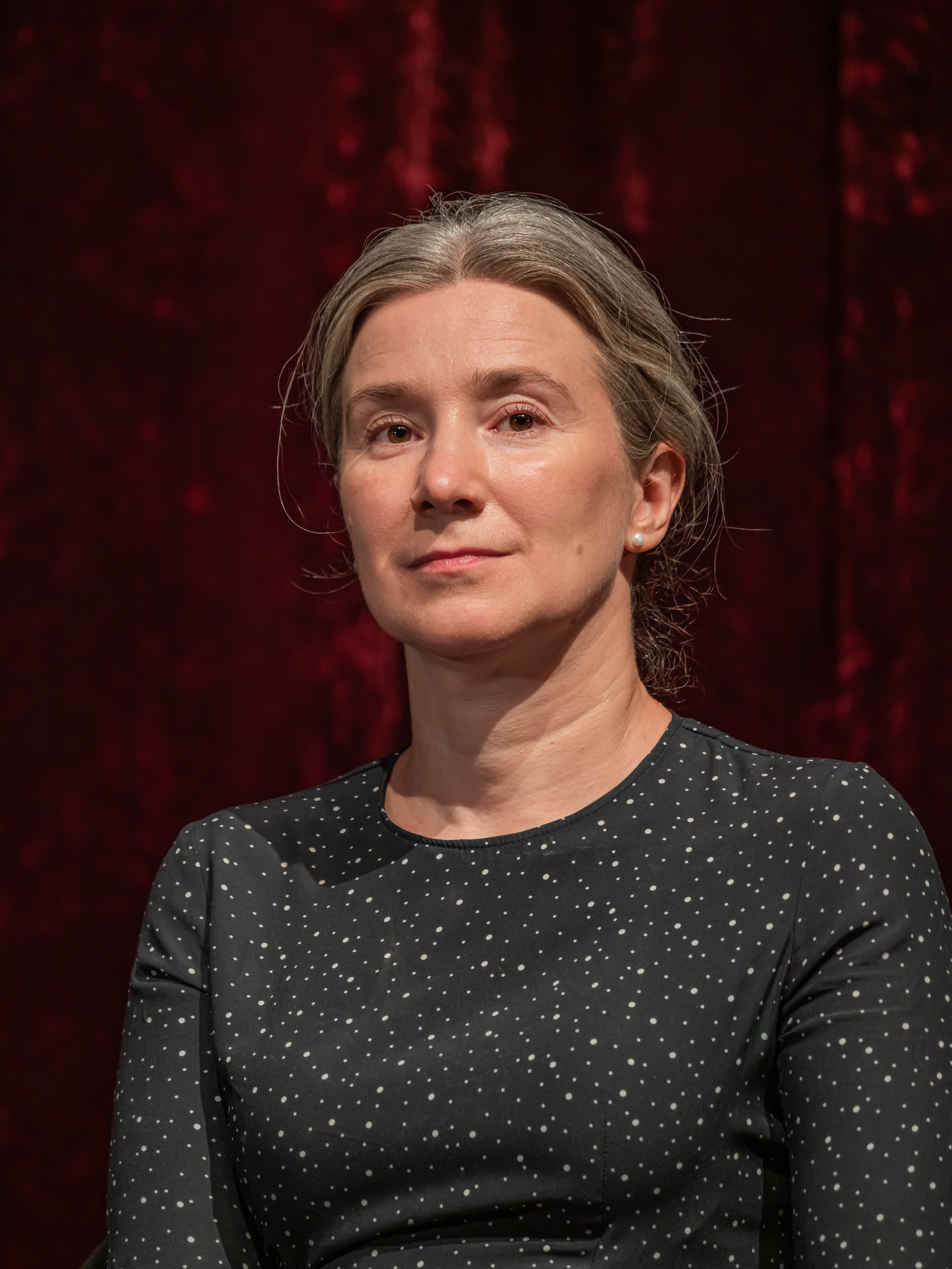
- Schulmann in 2024
- Born: Ekaterina Mikhailovna Zaslavskaya; August 19, 1978 (age 48); Tula, Russian SFSR, Soviet Union
- Spouse: Mikhail Schulmann
- Awards: Glamour Woman of the Year award (2020); Federal Chamber of Advocates of Russian Federation Medal 'For Contribution to the Development of the Rule of Law' (2021)

Academic background
- Education: RANEPA (Bachelor, Candidate of Sciences)
- Thesis: Political Conditions and Factors of Transformation in the Legislative Process in Modern Russia (2013)
- Doctoral advisor: Elena Morozova

Academic work
- Discipline: Political science
- Institutions: RANEPA (2013—2022); MSSES (2021—2022); Free University of Berlin (since 2022); Maqsut Narikbayev University (2023—2024)
- Main interests: Lawmaking, bureaucracy, decision-making mechanisms in contemporary autocracies

YouTube information
- Channel: Екатерина Шульман
- Subscribers: 1.22 million
- Views: 227 million
- Last updated: 31 March 2024

Ekaterina Mikhailovna Schulmann (Note: Also transliterated as Shulman.) (Russian: Екатерина Михайловна Шульман, Yekaterina Mikhaylovna Shulman; née Zaslavskaya (Заславская); born 19 August 1978) is a Russian political scientist specializing in legislative processes and authoritarian governance. Schulmann was a senior lecturer at RANEPA from 2013 to 2022 and an associate professor at Moscow School for the Social and Economic Sciences from 2021 to 2022. She is currently a fellow of the Robert Bosch Academy Berlin, an associate fellow of Chatham House, a non-resident scholar at Carnegie Russia Eurasia Center in Berlin, and an invited lecturer at the Institute for East European Studies of Free University of Berlin.

She works as a lecturer and political commentator, gives expert commentary to the media, and hosts her own political radio talk show. As of August 2022, her YouTube channel has one million subscribers.

== Biography ==
=== Education and career ===
Schulmann was born in Tula to Michael and Olga Zaslavsky. Her maternal grandparents both were professors at Tula State Pedagogical University. Michael Zaslavsky had a Ph.D. in engineering and worked as provost at Tula Institute of Economics and Informatics. Professor Olga Zaslavsky is Head of the Department of Theoretical and Practical Pedagogics at TSPU.

In 1995, Schulmann graduated with honors from public school №73 and went to Canada, where in 1996 she graduated from George Brown College in Toronto. In 1999 she moved to Moscow, where In March–September 1999 she was a senior editor at Russian News and Information Agency Novosti. Later in 1999, she started working at the State Duma, staying there in various posts (deputy's assistant, political faction analyst and expert in the analytical department) until 2011.

In 2001–2005, she studied law at Russian Presidential Academy of National Economy and Public Administration.

In 2006-11, Schulmann was director of legislative research at The PBN Company, a consulting firm.

In 2013, she obtained a Candidate of Sciences degree in political science at RANEPA and was hired by the Russian Presidential Academy of National Economy and Public Administration. Her research interests include the legislative process in modern Russia, parliamentarism and decision-making mechanisms in hybrid political regimes. From 2013 until its closure Schulmann was a lecturer in the Moscow School of Civic Education.

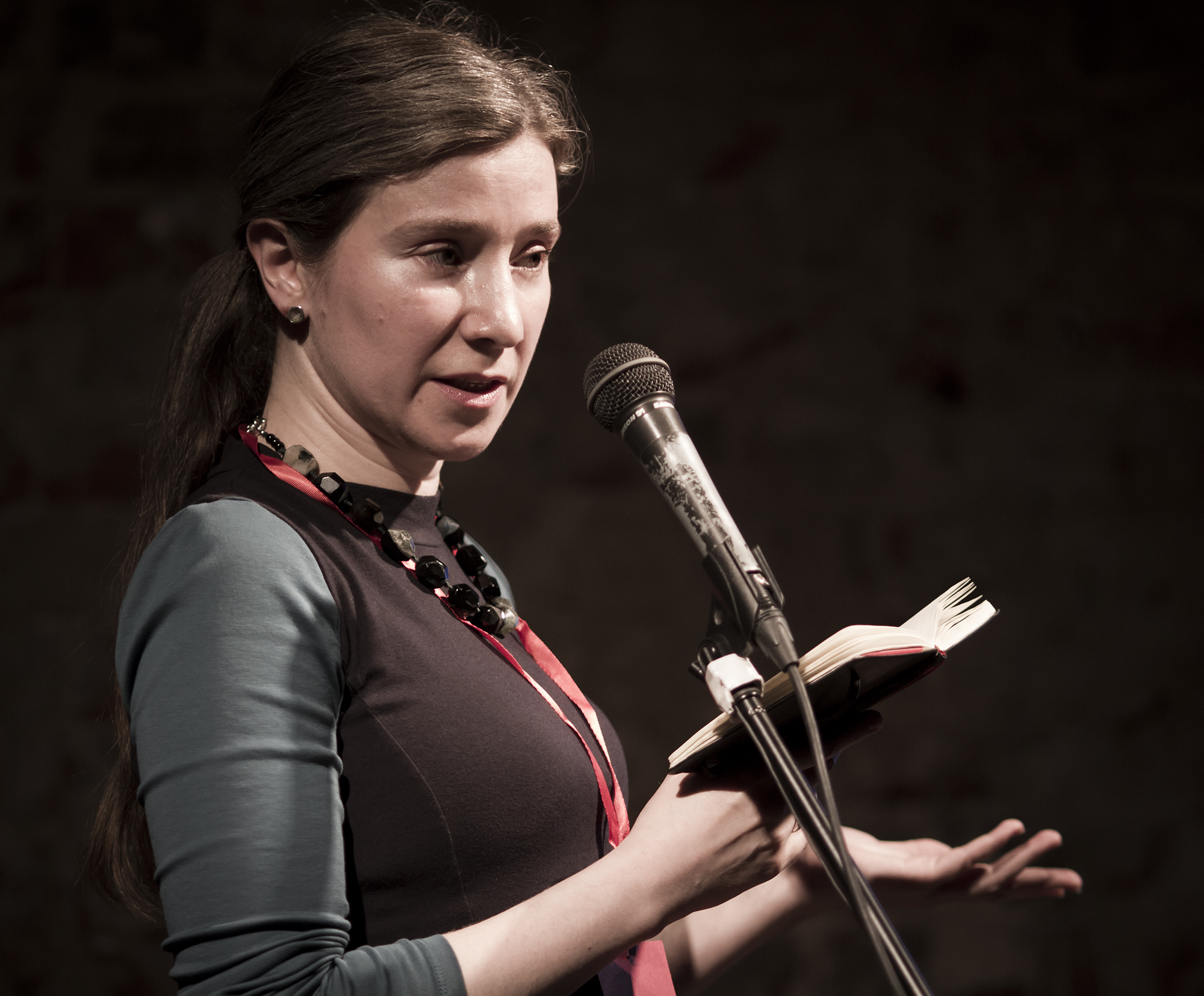
Schulmann giving a lecture in Sakharov Center, 23 June 2017

In 2013, she became a senior lecturer at Russian Presidential Academy of National Economy and Public Administration.

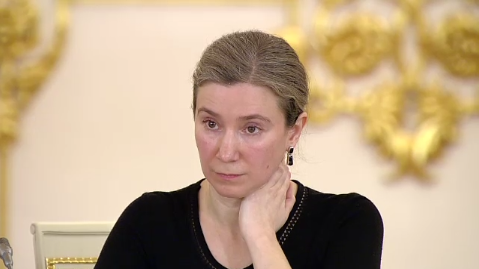
Schulmann during the Presidential Council for Civil Society and Human Rights meeting, 11 December 2018

In 2018, she was elected a member of the Presidential Council for Civil Society and Human Rights. On 21 October 2019, she was dismissed from the council.

In 2019, she was promoted to Director of RANEPA's Center for Legislative Studies and started working as an associate professor at MSSES.

Since January 2023, Schulmann has been an associate professor at M. Narikbayev University (KAZGUU) in Astana, Kazakhstan; she teaches political science at the university.

=== Media projects ===
Since 2013, Schulmann has written as a columnist or a commentator for Vedomosti, The New Times, Colta.ru, Republic.ru, Grani.ru.

In 2016, she launched her YouTube channel, dedicated to lawmaking and politics. Soon she accumulated a wide audience of all ages, including teenagers. Memes and citations with Schulmann became viral in Runet, TikTok, etc.

In 2017, she started her own show ‘Status’ on Echo of Moscow radio station. The show broadcasts every Tuesday at 9 PM, covering actual legal and political topics in Russia and includes educational material.

== Political views and activities ==
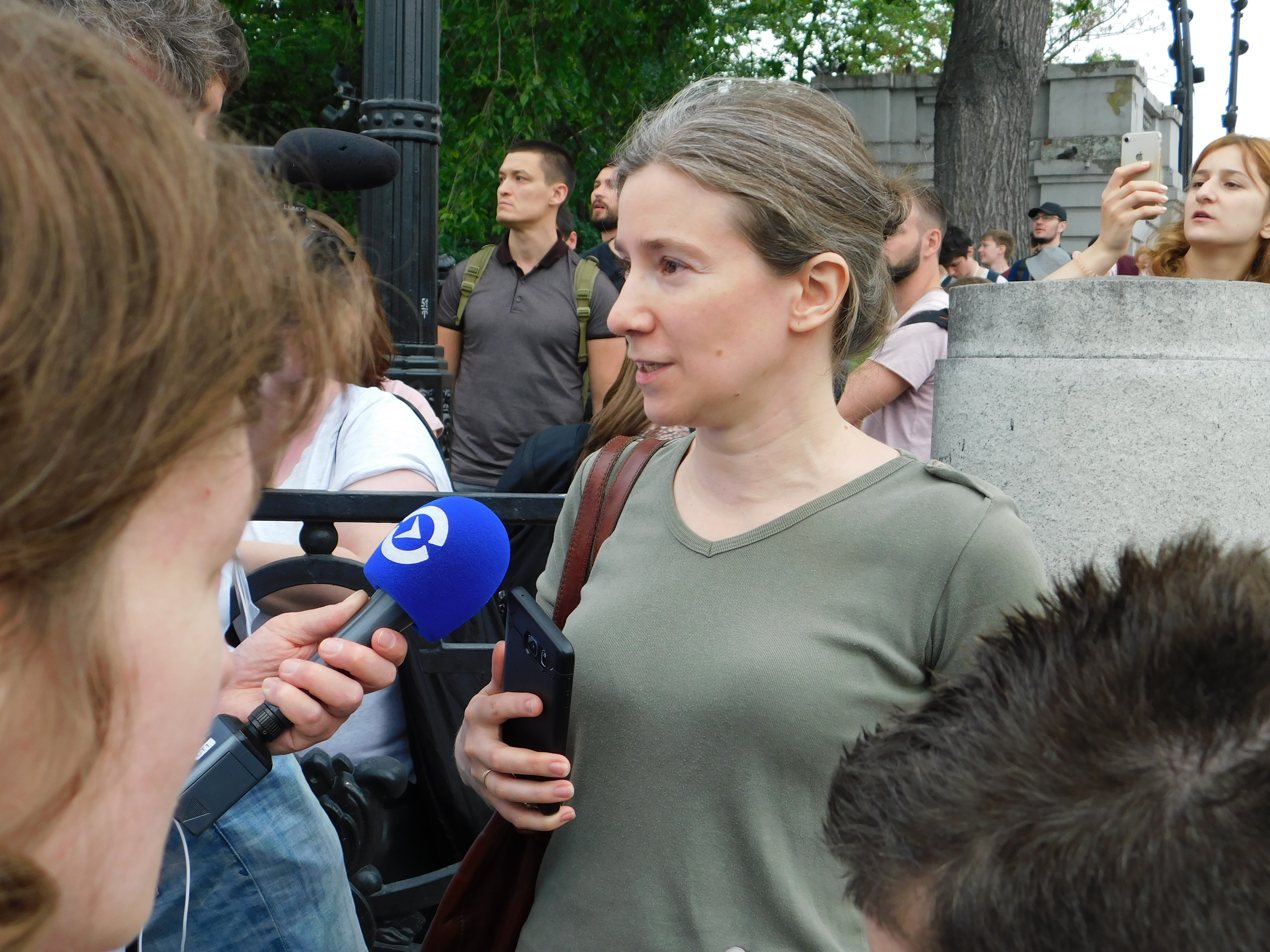
Schulmann at the "Golunov march" in Moscow, 12 June 2019

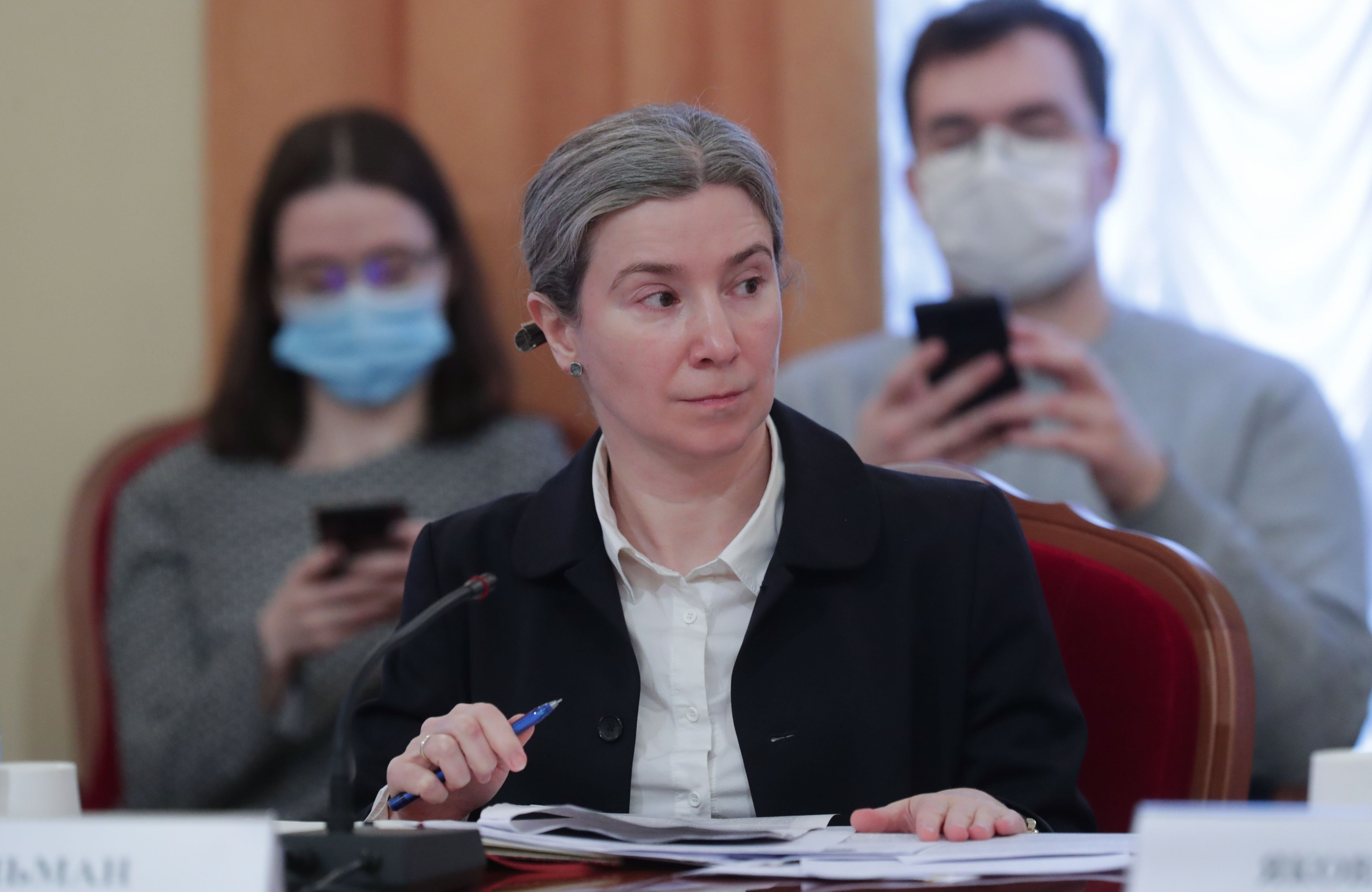
Schulmann during the New People roundtable discussion on changes in legislation devoted to fighting torture in Russia, 21 January 2022

As a member of the Presidential Council for Civil Society and Human Rights, Schulmann contributed to the protection of the people accused under the Moscow Case (2019) after 2019 Moscow protests. She publicly opposed their charges under civil disorder article 212 of the Russian Criminal Code, visited the arrested in detention centers and helped with legal defense in court.

When MSSES rector Sergey Zuev was arrested in October 2021, Schulmann publicly spoke out in his defense, signed a collective letter in his support and waited in front of the courthouse during sessions to show her support along with other Zuev's friends and colleagues.

On January 31, 2021, Schulmann's husband was detained during a protest rally in support of Alexei Navalny in Moscow.

On 12 April 2022, Schulmann announced that she was offered a fellowship by the Robert Bosch Stiftung and left Russia for Germany to work as an associate professor, stating that she was not moving away indefinitely.

On 15 April 2022, the Russian justice ministry included Schulmann in its "foreign agents" list. As explained by Schulmann, it means she cannot return to Russia, because as a designated foreign agent, any public appearances and teaching are practically impossible for her to conduct there. In February 2025, an investigation was initiated against Schulmann under Article 20.33 of the Code on Administrative Offenses for her involvement in an undesirable organization. In March 2025, the Russian internal ministry declared her a wanted fugitive.

== Family ==
She is married to Mikhail Schulmann, an expert on Vladimir Nabokov and a literary critic, whom she met on the Internet via LiveJournal.ru. The Schulmanns have three children (two daughters and a son) together. She is an atheist.

== Recognition ==
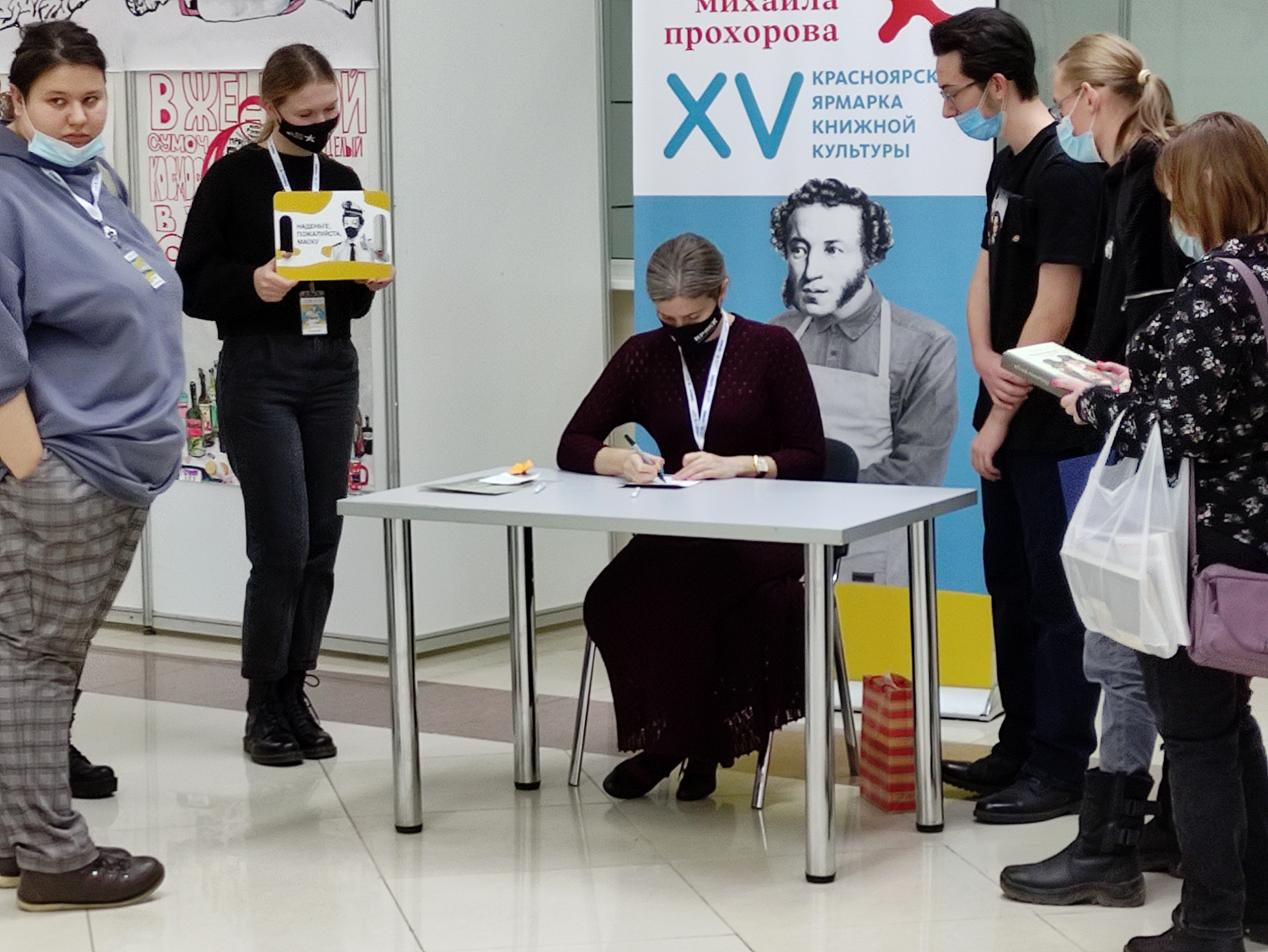
Schulmann signs autographs at a book fair in Krasnoyarsk, 2021

According to the Levada Center's 2020 research, Schulmann was one of the most inspiring Russians for respondents between 40 and 55 years of age. Glamour magazine named her Woman of the Year in 2020. On April 13, 2021, she was awarded a medal ‘For Contribution to the Development of the Rule of Law’ by the Federal Chamber of Advocates.

Russian journalist Vladimir Guriev once jokingly said that he hoped Schulmann would be Russia's next president. Though Schulmann herself has denied any ambition in that sphere, the slogan ‘Schulmann to presidency’ became popular on the Russian-speaking internet.

In 2021, Oxxxymiron mentioned her in his rap song Agent ("No milf is sexier than Ekaterina Schulmann"), which was widely discussed online. Schulmann herself declined to comment on it.

== Criticism ==
In 2017, political scientist Vyacheslav Danilov criticized Shulman's lecture for the Open University for what he considered to be numerous factual errors. At the same time, Danilov did not deny Shulman's “tremendous success” and “explosive popularity.” He noted that Shulman is “undoubtedly a bright speaker; she makes politics understandable and interesting to the general public.”

In 2017, Grigory Golosov, Doctor of Political Science, wrote a Facebook post listing errors made by Shulman regarding the nature of political regimes in various countries. Golosov criticized the concept of hybrid regimes, which Shulman helped popularize. He pointed out the looseness, vagueness, and internal inconsistency of the term “hybrid regimes.” Golosov's critique was supported by Boris Vishnevsky, journalist Aleksandr Morozov, and political strategist Gleb Pavlovsky.

== Publications ==
=== Books ===
- Законотворчество как политический процесс (Lawmaking as a political process, 2014)
- Практическая политология: пособие по контакту с реальностью (Practical political science: A textbook on a contact with reality, 2015)
- Возвращение государства. Россия в нулевые 2000-2012 (Return of the state. Russia in 2000–2012, 2023)

=== Research articles ===
In English

- Schulmann, Ekaterina (2015-07-04). "Duma-2014 Report". Russian Politics & Law. 53 (4): 57–65. doi:10.1080/10611940.2016.1142334. ISSN 1061-1940. S2CID 148433319.
- Schulmann, Ekaterina (2018). "The Russian political system in transition: Scenarios for power transfer". NUPI Working Paper (883). Norwegian Institute of International Affairs: 20. hdl:11250/2578621.
- Noble, Ben; Schulmann, Ekaterina (2018). "Not Just a Rubber Stamp: Parliament and Lawmaking". The New Autocracy: Information, Politics, and Policy in Putin's Russia. Brookings Institution Press. p. 49. ISBN 9780815732433. JSTOR 10.7864/j.ctt1zkjzsh.6.
