= Mikhail Benyash =

Russian lawyer (born 1977)

- Михаил Беньяш
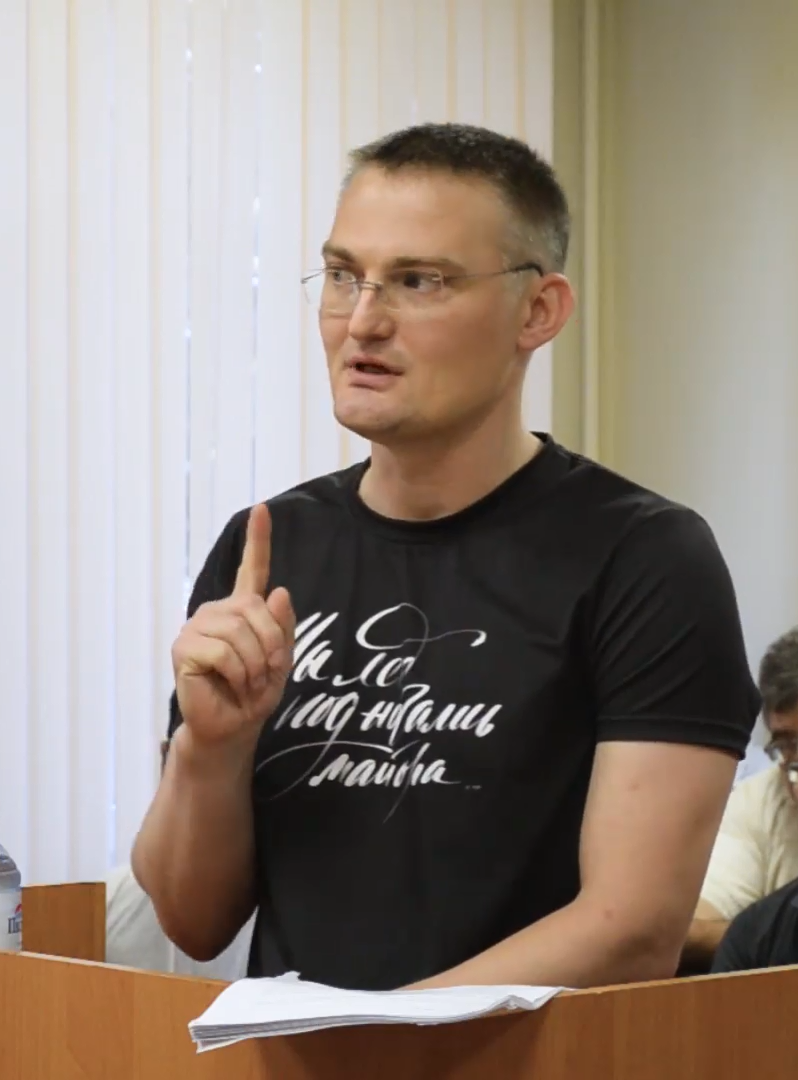
- Born: September 2, 1977 (age 48); Sochi, Krasnodar Krai, Russian SSR, USSR
- Citizenship: Russia
- Occupation: Lawyer
- Criminal charges: Defamation
- Criminal penalty: Fine

Mikhail Mikhailovich Benyash (Russian: Михаил Михайлович Беньяш; born 2 September 1977) is a Russian lawyer (former advocate) based in Krasnodar Krai, known for his support of human rights activists and conscientious objectors until he was disbarred in 2023. During his career, Benyash was subjected to multiple arrests and criminal sentences, which led to him fleeing Russia and claiming asylum in Lithuania.

== Biography ==
Benyash was born in Sochi in 1977. After the graduation from the school, he was conscripted to the Russian Armed Forces. After the demobilization, he studied law at the Sochi branch of the Russian State Social University. After the graduation from the university, he served since 2003 as an judicial officer. In 2005, after passing the bar exam, he became an advocate. He handled civil cases related to opposition to infill development and criminal cases related to economic crimes.

From 2017, Benyash was actively involved in the defence of activists and supporters of opposition leader and activist Alexei Navalny. He also represented soldiers who did not wish to fight in Ukraine.

Following the deprivation his advocate's status in Russia, Benyash emigrated to Lithuania, where he worked as a plumber.

In August 2025, Benyash harshly criticized the Anti-Corruption Foundation and, in particular, Leonid Volkov, accusing them of a lack of democracy, accountability and responsibility to supporters, and professional competence in their activities, as well as of betraying the legacy of Alexei Navalny.

On 3 December 2025, it was reported that the Lithuanian immigration authorities had revoked Benyash's residence permit because he had traveled to Belarus twice in August 2025: first time — to pick up his young son, and second time — to return him to his mother. The decision of revoking of the residence permit was appealed in a Lithuanian court. The court of first instance rejected the administrative claim, but the Supreme Administrative Court of Lithuania overturned this decision and satisfied the administrative plaintiff's claims.

== Criminal proceedings ==
=== 2010 extortion case ===
In September 2010, a criminal case was opened against Benyash under article 163 of the Criminal Code of the Russia after he was accused of extorting Konstantin Apostolov, a businessman from Sochi, to give him $25, 000, under the threat of disseminating defamatory information about him. Benyash denied the charges, stating he had given Apostolov the money for courtyard improvements, and stated the charges were linked to him having previously defended Dmitry Novikov, a former judge at the Khostinsky District Court in Sochi, who had been accused of fraud. In September 2011, Benyash was given a three year suspended prison sentence.

=== 2018 assault case ===
On 9 September 2018, Benyash was detained in Krasnodar while participating in a protest against the raising of the retirement age. He was accused of disobeying the demands of police officers and holding a public event without notifying authorities. On 10 September, he was sentenced to 14 days' detention and 40 hours of community service. Benyash's lawyer claimed that he had been threatened with assault by police officers.

After serving his detention, Benyash was arrested again on 28 September on charges of using violence against police officers and obstructing justice. The obstruction case was subsequently dismissed due to lack of evidence. Benyash was placed in a temporary detention facility for two months by the Leninsky District Court in Krasnodar. A public campaign of support for Benyash was launched after his arrest, following which the Krasnodar Krai Prosecutor's Office asked to overturn the decision to arrest him. On 23 October, the Krasnodar Krai Court released Benyash on bail of 600, 000 RUB. On 11 October 2019, Benyash was sentenced to a fine of 30, 000 RUB.

In July 2023, the European Court of Human Rights ruled that Benyash's detention had been unfounded and that his own allegations of being beaten by police officers had not been properly investigated, ordering Russia to pay him €16, 000 in compensation.

=== 2021 and 2022 home searches ===
On 22 January 2021, a search was conducted at Benyash's home in connection to a criminal case against his landlord's son, based on the theft of a fake pistol. The pistol was not found, but two laptops were seized from Benyash's home. Benyash was subsequently detained after announcing a rally in support of Alexei Navalny; he was sentenced to five days of administrative arrest.

On 12 March 2022, an additional search was completed of Benyash's home following a report of a false bomb threat.

=== 2022 Russian Armed Force complaint case ===
On 13 April 2022, police officers in Krasnodar drew up charges against Benyash under article 20.3.3 of the Code of the Russian Federation on Administrative Offenses after a video published on 28 February from the Krasnodar-based outlet Protokol in which Benyash criticised the Russian invasion of Ukraine. The Leninsky District Court in Krasnodar dismissed the case due to procedural violations committed by the police, though the Krasnodar Regional Court subsequently reversed this decision following a complaint by the police. Later, the case was finally closed due to the expiration of statute of limitations for cases of administrative offences.

In November 2022, the new case was opened by the Krasnodar police against Benyash due to around two dozen Telegram posts written by him that included the phrase "no to war". On 7 February 2023, the court fined Benyash for "discrediting the Russian Armed Forces".

=== 2022 labelling as a foreign agent ===
On 28 October 2022, the Ministry of Justice added Benyash to the register of foreign agents after he had reposted materials of The Insider and the Telegram-channel Neural Meduza in addition to allegations that he received funds from three organisations already listed as "foreign agents". Benyash filed an administrative claim for plea of nullity of the decision of the Ministry of Justice. He pointed out that the money he had received from these organisation was the attorney's fee for the legal aid he had provided to them, and these organisations were not declared as "foreign agents" on the dates of signing of legal aid agreements. However, the Pervomaysky District Court in Krasnodar dismissed the claim.

=== 2023 disbarment ===
In February 2023, the Council of the Bar Association of Krasnodar Krai stripped Benyash of his status as an advocate following a complaint made by the Ministry of Justice in which Benyash was accused of making critical statements about Russian authorities, including the Ministry itself, as well as of the leadership of the Russian bar association. Benyach was charged with the violation of the Advocate's Conduct Code because of seven posts on Telegram, two of which were confirmed: one on 6 October 2022 where he called the leadership of the Russian bar association "irreplaceable and unelected servile opportunists with portraits of Stalin in their offices", and another on 31 October 2022 where he called the Ministry of Justice "idiots" after recognising him as a foreign agent.

Benyash appealed the decision of the Krasnodar Krai Bar Association to the Federal Bar Association, which agreed with the regional associations' findings. He filed an administrative claim at the Khamovnichesky District Court in Moscow to invalidate the decision of his advocate's status deprivation. The court rejected the administrative claim, citing the fact that the decision of the deprivation of the advocate's status of the administrative plaintiff was made in compliance with the procedure established by the law, while the legality and validity of this decision on the merits cannot be the subject of the court's assessment.
