= Awards of the National Guard of the Russian Federation =

The National Guard of the Russian Federation came into being on April 5, 2016 by decree of the President of the Russian Federation № 157. Being a uniformed paramilitary organisation, it has its own awards system subordinate to State awards of the Russian Federation.

== National Guard of the Russian Federation ==
=== Medals ===
Award	Name (English/Russian)	Order	Inception Date	Award Criteria
	Medal "For Distinction in Combat" Медаль "За Боевое Отличия"	№ 50	2017-02-14	Awarded to servicemen and officers of the troops of the National Guard of the Russian Federation, for distinction, courage and dedication displayed in the performance of tasks in combat conditions and during special operations involving a risk to life, during counter-terrorist operations, in conditions of armed conflict, during military or emergency situations; for initiative and skillful and decisive actions that contributed to the successful performance of combat missions and special operations during counter-terrorist operations, in conditions of armed conflict, during military or emergency situations; for the successful management of the actions of subordinates in the performance of combat missions and special operations, during counter-terrorist operations, in conditions of armed conflict, during military or emergency situations.
	Medal "For Displayed Valour" 1st class Медаль "За проявленную доблесть" I степени	№ 50 - № 365	2017-02-14 ---------- 2017-08-22	Awarded to military personnel, employees and federal civil servants of the Troops of the National Guard of the Russian Federation; for excellent performance in combat (professional, leadership) training, during professional service activities; for specific distinction, displayed military bearing in service, high performance indicators in military service (operational duty, service, combat) tasks and exercises; for high results in service and combat, in operational performance, in performance management; for achievements in the protection of public order and public security; for active work in the protection of public order, combating crime and the fight against terrorism and extremism; for bravery, dedication and other merit displayed during military service (work); for excellent and efficient civil service. The medal is awarded in 3 classes awarded successively from the lowest to the highest degree, the medal 1st class being the higher.
	Medal "For Displayed Valour" 2nd class Медаль "За проявленную доблесть" II степени	№ 50 - № 365	2017-02-14 ---------- 2017-08-22	Awarded to military personnel, employees and federal civil servants of the Troops of the National Guard of the Russian Federation; for excellent performance in combat (professional, leadership) training, during professional service activities; for specific distinction, displayed military bearing in service, high performance indicators in military service (operational duty, service, combat) tasks and exercises; for high results in service and combat, in operational performance, in performance management; for achievements in the protection of public order and public security; for active work in the protection of public order, combating crime and the fight against terrorism and extremism; for bravery, dedication and other merit displayed during military service (work); for excellent and efficient civil service. The medal is awarded in 3 classes awarded successively from the lowest to the highest degree, the medal 1st class being the higher.
	Medal "For Displayed Valour" 3rd class Медаль "За проявленную доблесть" III степени	№ 365	2017-08-22	Awarded to military personnel, employees and federal civil servants of the Troops of the National Guard of the Russian Federation; for excellent performance in combat (professional, leadership) training, during professional service activities; for specific distinction, displayed military bearing in service, high performance indicators in military service (operational duty, service, combat) tasks and exercises; for high results in service and combat, in operational performance, in performance management; for achievements in the protection of public order and public security; for active work in the protection of public order, combating crime and the fight against terrorism and extremism; for bravery, dedication and other merit displayed during military service (work); for excellent and efficient civil service. The medal is awarded in 3 classes awarded successively from the lowest to the highest degree, the medal 1st class being the higher.
	Medal "For Mine Clearing" Медаль "За разминирование"	№ 50	2017-02-14	Awarded to military personnel and employees of the troops of the National Guard of the Russian Federation for dedication, courage, bravery and professionalism displayed: when performing tasks in the detection and neutralization (destruction) of explosive objects on the ground (in sites); for the organization and the direct management of measures in the detection and neutralization (destruction) of explosive objects on the ground (in sites); for the participation in inter-agency mine-clearance operations. May be awarded to other persons for assistance in carrying out the tasks entrusted to the troops of the National Guard of the Russian Federation in the detection and neutralization (destruction) of explosive objects on the ground (in sites).
	Medal "For Life Saving" Медаль "За спасение"	№ 50	2017-02-14	Awarded to soldiers, officers, federal civil servants and employees of the troops of the National Guard of the Russian Federation, as well as to citizens of the Russian Federation and other persons for courage and self-sacrifice in conditions involving a risk to life: during skilled, energetic and decisive actions that contributed to the successful implementation of measures to eliminate the consequences of emergency situations, fire fighting, rescue on water bodies, rescue of people and salvation of property; during the successful guidance of the actions of subordinates in carrying out tasks in the aftermath of an emergency, fire-fighting and rescue on bodies of water; during the rescue of people amid natural disasters, on the water, under the earth, in fire-fighting and in other circumstances; during skilful, resolute actions and for professional excellence contributing to the prevention of accidents on bodies of water.
	Medal "General of Infantry E.F. Komarovsky" Медаль "Генерал от инфантерии Е.Ф. Комаровский"	№ 209	2019-06-17	Awarded to military personnel (junior, middle and senior commanders), employees (junior, middle and senior managers) of the forces of the National Guard of the Russian Federation, federal state civil servants of the forces of the National Guard, if previously awarded departmental awards of the forces of the National Guard and having military seniority (service), or experience of state civil service of at least 15 years: for exemplary performance of official duties, high achievements in combat training of subordinate military personnel (employees) of structural units of the central apparatus of the Russian Guard, operational-territorial associations, formations, military units of the forces of the National Guard, territorial bodies of the Russian Guard, military educational organizations of higher education and other military organizations of the National Guard; for high personal indicators in official activities and professional training, courage and selflessness displayed during the performance of service-combat (service, operational) tasks; for personal merit in the formation and development of troops of the National Guard, increasing the prestige of military service; for a significant contribution to the development and implementation of state policy and legal regulations in the field of 0activity of the forces of the National Guard, in the sphere of arms circulation, in the field of private security activities, in the field of private detective activities and in the field of private security; for successes in strengthening military cooperation and military ties with foreign states. May also be awarded to other citizens of the Russian Federation for assisting in the accomplishment of tasks and the exercise of the powers vested to the troops of the National Guard.
	Medal "Army General Yakovlev" Медаль "Генерал армии Яковлев"	№ 17	2018-01-23	Awarded to servicemen (with greater seniority and rank), employees (with greater seniority and rank), federal state civil servants, troops of the National Guard of the Russian Federation, temporarily replacing in military managerial positions (commanders, directors) of structural units of the central office of the National Guard of the Russian Federation, operational-territorial associations, formations, military units of the troops of the national guard, territorial bodies of the National Guard of the Russian Federation, organizations of higher education and other organizations of the troops of the National Guard and their deputies, as well as those who pass military service (service) in posts related to management of subdivisions, with at least 3 years in those positions: for the able leadership of military units (organizations) which contributed to the achievement of high performances in combat service and operational-service activities; for high professionalism shown in the management of military units (organizations) in the performance of combat service and operational-service tasks. May also be awarded to other citizens of the Russian Federation for assisting managers (commanders, directors) of military units (organizations) of the troops of the National Guard in carrying out the tasks assigned to them.
	Medal "Veteran of Service" Медаль "Ветеран службы"	№ 50 - № 233	2017-02-14 ---------- 2017-07-24	Awarded to: soldiers and employees of the troops of the National Guard of the Russian Federation transferred to the reserves (retirement) when they reach the age limit for military service, or for health reasons, in connection with organizational and staffing measures for fair and long-term military service having a length of service of 25 years or more in calendar-years and who were awarded medals "For Distinction in Service" (or similar medals for long service of other governmental bodies of the Russian Federation) and who served at least 5 years in the troops of the National Guard of the Russian Federation; Federal civil servants troops of the troops of the National Guard of the Russian Federation at retirement of the civil service for excellent and efficient civil service, with a total length of state civil service of 25 years or more and who have worked at least 5 years in the troops of the National Guard of the Russian Federation. In some cases, military personnel, employees and federal civil servants of the National Guard of the Russian Federation, who in the period of military service (service, state civil service) have made a significant contribution to the formation and development of the National Guard of the Russian Federation may be presented without taking into account the minimum 5 year service (service, state civil service) in the troops of the National Guard of the Russian Federation.
	Medal "For Military Cooperation" Медаль "За боевое содружество"	№ 50	2017-02-14	Awarded to soldiers, officers, federal civil servants and employees of the troops of the National Guard of the Russian Federation for the strengthening of military cooperation including with other friendly nations. May also be awarded to other citizens of the Russian Federation and foreign citizens for the same reason.
	Medal "For Service in Strengthening Law and Order" Медаль "За заслуги в укреплении правопорядка"	№ 50	2017-02-14	Awarded to soldiers, officers, federal civil servants and employees of the troops of the National Guard of the Russian Federation, to citizens of the Russian Federation and other persons: for significant contribution to the strengthening of the rule of law; for improving the legal regulation of the troops of the National Guard of the Russian Federation; for the training of qualified personnel for the troops of the National Guard of the Russian Federation; for active participation in covering the activities of the troops of the Russian Federation of the National Guard in the media.
	Medal "For Meritorious Work" Медаль "За заслуги в труде"	№ 50 - № 233	2017-02-14 ---------- 2017-07-24	Awarded to federal civil servants and employees of the troops of the National Guard of the Russian Federation, with seniority (state civil service seniority) of 15 years and over who have worked in the troops of the National Guard of the Russian Federation for at least 3 years: for excellent and efficient civil service; for many years of fruitful work, achievements in the performance of professional duties and for high quality work.
	Medal "For Distinguished Service" 1st class Mедаль "За отличие в службе" I степени	№ 50 - № 233	2017-02-14 ---------- 2017-07-24	Awarded to military personnel serving under contract and military staff members of the troops of the National Guard of the Russian Federation, who positively influenced the service, for conscientious military service and 20 years (years of service) seniority in service or in part-time military service; to persons with prior military service in the Internal Troops of the MVD of Russia, transferred from military service in organs of the MVD to the troops of the National Guard of the Russian Federation after April 5, 2016 who would’ve been awarded the Medal of the Ministry of Interior of Russia "For Distinction in Service", with the required length of military service (seniority) at the time of transfer, who positively influenced the service.
	Medal "For Distinguished Service" 2nd class Mедаль "За отличие в службе" II степени	№ 50 - № 233	2017-02-14 ---------- 2017-07-24	Awarded to military personnel serving under contract and military staff members of the troops of the National Guard of the Russian Federation, who positively influenced the service, for conscientious military service and 15 years (years of service) seniority in service or in part-time military service; to persons with prior military service in the Internal Troops of the MVD of Russia, transferred from military service in organs of the MVD to the troops of the National Guard of the Russian Federation after April 5, 2016 who would’ve been awarded the Medal of the Ministry of Interior of Russia "For Distinction in Service", with the required length of military service (seniority) at the time of transfer, who positively influenced the service.
	Medal "For Distinguished Service" 3rd class Mедаль "За отличие в службе" III степени	№ 50	2017-02-14	Awarded to military personnel serving under contract and military staff members of the troops of the National Guard of the Russian Federation, who positively influenced the service, for conscientious military service and 10 years (years of service) seniority in service or in part-time military service; to persons with prior military service in the Internal Troops of the MVD of Russia, transferred from military service in organs of the MVD to the troops of the National Guard of the Russian Federation after April 5, 2016 who would’ve been awarded the Medal of the Ministry of Interior of Russia "For Distinction in Service", with the required length of military service (seniority) at the time of transfer, who positively influenced the service.
	Medal "For Outstanding Academic Achievements" Медаль "За особые достижения в учебе"	№ 50	2017-02-14	Awarded to military personnel who completed training in vocational institutions of higher education of the troops of the National Guard of the Russian Federation under programs of higher professional education and who passed all the examinations (tests with an assessment) stipulated in the curriculum and the final certification tests with an "excellent" score (in physical training (culture) only the in final evaluation).
	Medal "For the Promotion of the National Guard" Медаль "За содействие Росгвардии"	№ 50	2017-02-14	Awarded to citizens who distinguished themselves for their assistance in fulfilling the tasks and exercising the powers assigned to the troops of the National Guard of the Russian Federation. Servicemen, officers, federal state civil servants and employees of the troops of the National Guard of the Russian Federation are not eligible for award of this medal.
	Commemorative medal "100 Years of the Founding of the Financial and Economic Service" Памятный медаль "100 лет со дня образования финансово-экономической службы"	№ 210	2018-06-28	Awarded to military personnel, persons serving in the forces of the National Guard and having special police ranks, and to civilian personnel (federal state civil servants and employees) of the financial and economic (financial) bodies (units) of the troops of the National Guard, who served impeccably (worked) for 20 years or more in the financial and economic (financial) bodies (units) of federal executive bodies in which federal law provides for military service (work); citizens discharged from military service (work) to the reserves (retirement), who have served impeccably for 20 years or more in calendar terms in the financial and economic (financial) bodies (units) of the federal executive bodies in which military service (work) is provided for by federal law; to persons assisting in the performance of tasks and the application of the powers vested in the financial and economic (financial) bodies (units) of the forces of the National Guard.
	Commemorative medal "50 Years of the Main Organizational and Mobilization Directorate" Памятный медаль "50 лет Главному организационно-мобилизационному управлению "	№ 345	2018-07-31	Awarded to military personnel and state civil servants of the Main Organizational and Mobilization Directorate of the Russian National Guard; to the heads of organizational and mobilization departments and manning departments of operational-territorial and associations, to the heads of combat units of military educational organizations of higher education, to the heads of the department of organizational and manning of military unit 3111 of the National Guard of the Russian Federation; to military and civilian personnel of the National Guard, as well as persons serving in the National Guard with special police ranks making a significant contribution and assisting in the fulfillment of the tasks assigned to the organizational and mobilization units of the national guard; to veterans of the organizational and mobilization units of Internal Troops of the Ministry of Internal Affairs of Russia and the troops of the national guard, who have made a significant contribution to the fulfillment of the tasks assigned to them; to other persons assisting in the implementation of tasks and the exercise of the powers vested the Main Organizational and Mobilization Directorate of the Russian National Guard.
	Commemorative medal "50 Years of the Establishment of State Permits and Licensing Units" Памятный медаль "50 лет со дня образования подразделений государственного контроля и лицензионно-разрешительной работы"	№ 23	2019-01-23	Awarded to military personnel, persons serving in the forces of the National Guard with special police ranks, and civilian personnel (federal state civil servants and employees) of the forces of the National Guard, who have served (worked) impeccably for three years or more in calendar terms, in the licensing and permit units of organs of the Ministry of Internal Affairs of Russia and the National Guard; to citizens discharged from military service to the reserves (retirement), who have made a significant contribution to the performance of tasks and the exercise of the powers assigned to licensing and permit units; to persons assisting in the performance of tasks and the exercise of the powers vested in the licensing and permits units.
	Commemorative medal "For participant of the Special Military Operation"" Памятный медаль «Участнику специальной военной операции»"	№ 170	2022-05-26	By order of the Federal Service of the National Guard Troops of the Russian Federation dated May 26, 2022, No. 170, a commemorative medal "Participant in a Special Military Operation" was established; the document was registered by the Ministry of Justice of the Russian Federation and published on June 27, 2022. Therefore, it is awarded to: "military personnel, persons serving in the troops of the National Guard of the Russian Federation and holding special police ranks, federal state civil servants and employees of the National Guard troops who took part in the Special Military Operation, for conscientious military service"; "persons who previously served in the military (service, carried out labor activities) in the troops of the National Guard, took part in the Special Military Operation, and were positively characterized in service"; "persons who distinguished themselves in providing assistance in the performance of tasks assigned to the troops of the National Guard during the Special Military Operation."

=== Decorations ===
Award	Name (English/Russian)	Order	Inception Date	Award Criteria
	Honorary title "Honoured Fellow of the National Guard" Почетное звание "Почетный сотрудник Росгвардии"	№ 50	2017-02-14	Awarded to military personnel, federal state civil servants and employees of troops of the National Guard of the Russian Federation who were previously awarded departmental awards of the National Guard and with seniority (experience) in military service or in the state civil service of at least 15 years: for the efficient organization of work and the pursuit of excellence in the performance of operational-territorial units, formations, military units and organizations of the troops of the National Guard of the Russian Federation as well as territorial organs of the National Guard; for the exemplary fulfillment of military and service duties, for displaying initiative and dedication; for outstanding achievements in the development of the National Guard, enhancing the prestige of military service (service) that promote the rule of law, who have made a significant contribution to the development and implementation of public policy and legal regulation in the sphere of National Guard activities, in the development National Guard, in the discharge of National Guard authority; for long and effective civil service; for many years of conscientious and impeccable work.
	Breast badge "For Distinction in Service in Special Circumstances" Нагрудный знак "За отличие в службе в особых условиях"	№ 50	2017-02-14	Awarded to servicemen, employees, federal state civil servants and workers of the troops of the National Guard of the Russian Federation for high performance in service (work) and diligence in performing tasks during periods of martial law or state of emergencies, during counter-terrorist operations, in conditions of armed conflict, during the liquidation of the consequences of accidents, natural and man-made disasters and other emergencies.
	Breast badge "For Distinction in Service" 1st class Нагрудный знак "За отличие в службе" I степени	№ 50	2017-02-14	Awarded to servicemen and employees of the troops of the National Guard of the Russian federation for initiative, diligence and distinction displayed in the performance of their tasks to protect public order, ensure public safety, protect important state facilities, special cargoes, communications facilities; for participation in the struggle against terrorism and extremism, participation in the provisions of emergency situations, martial law, counter-terrorist operations, as well as for active participation and displayed distinction during the tasks of liquidating the consequences of accidents, disasters, fires, natural disasters and other emergencies; for high performance in combat (operational-service) training; to citizens of the Russian Federation who distinguished themselves in assisting in the fulfillment of tasks and exercising the powers conferred on the troops of the National Guard of the Russian Federation. The highest class is the 1st class. Awards are carried out from the lowest to the highest class. Servicemen and employees, previously awarded the decoration of Internal Troops of the MVD "For Distinction in Service" 2nd class can be awarded with the National Guard decoration "For Distinction in Service" 1st class without award if the same decoration 2nd class.
	Breast badge "For Distinction in Service" 2nd class Нагрудный знак "За отличие в службе" II степени	№ 50	2017-02-14	Awarded to servicemen and employees of the troops of the National Guard of the Russian federation for initiative, diligence and distinction displayed in the performance of their tasks to protect public order, ensure public safety, protect important state facilities, special cargoes, communications facilities; for participation in the struggle against terrorism and extremism, participation in the provisions of emergency situations, martial law, counter-terrorist operations, as well as for active participation and displayed distinction during the tasks of liquidating the consequences of accidents, disasters, fires, natural disasters and other emergencies; for high performance in combat (operational-service) training; to citizens of the Russian Federation who distinguished themselves in assisting in the fulfillment of tasks and exercising the powers conferred on the troops of the National Guard of the Russian Federation. The highest class is the 1st class. Awards are carried out from the lowest to the highest class. Servicemen and employees, previously awarded the decoration of Internal Troops of the MVD "For Distinction in Service" 2nd class can be awarded with the National Guard decoration "For Distinction in Service" 1st class without award if the same decoration 2nd class.
	Breast badge "Participant in Combat Operations" Нагрудный знак "Участник боевых действий"	№ 50	2017-02-14	Awarded to servicemen and employees of the troops of the National Guard of the Russian Federation, who took a direct part in activities to ensure law and order and public security on the territory of combat operations during a period of martial law, counter-terrorism operations or armed conflict. Servicemen and employees already awarded the decoration of the MVD “Participant in Combat Operations” are not eligible for this award.
	Commemorative breast badge "100 years since the formation of the Separate Regiment “Orders of Zhukov, Lenin and October Revolution” of the Red Banner “F.E. Dzerzhinsky Special Assignments Division” of the troops of the National Guard of the Russian Federation" Памятный нагрудный знак "Федеральной службы войск национальной гвардии Российской Федерации "100 лет со дня образования 1 полка Отдельной орденов Жукова, Ленина и Октябрьской Революции Краснознаменной дивизии оперативного назначения имени Ф.Э.Дзержинского войск национальной гвардии Российской Федерации"	№ 522	2017-12-05	Awarded to servicemen and members of the civilian personnel performing military service (or engaged in labour activities) in Military Unit 3179 for the conscientious performance of official (labour) duties; servicemen, persons serving in the troops of the National Guard of the Russian Federation having special police titles and civilian personnel of the troops of the National Guard who had previously served in military unit 3179, as well as other persons, who assisted the troops of the National Guard in the performance of the tasks assigned to them and in the exercise of their powers.
	Decoration "Excellent Service in Operational and Special Motorized Military Units" Знак отличия "Отличник службы в воинских частях оперативного назначения и специальных моторизованных воинских частях "	№ 111	2018-04-02	Awarded to soldiers, sailors, sergeants and warrant-officers serving in military operational and special motorized military units of the National Guard for exemplary performance of military duties and excellent operational performance.
	Decoration "Excellent Service in Military Protection Units of Important State Facilities, Special Goods and Communications Facilities" Знак отличия "Отличник службы в воинских частях, выполняющих задачи по охране важных государственных объектов, специальных грузов, сооружений на коммуникациях"	№ 111	2018-04-02	Awarded to soldiers, sailors, sergeants and warrant-officers serving in military protection units of important state facilities, special goods and communications facilities of the National Guard for exemplary performance of military duties and excellent operational performance.
	Decoration "Excellent Service in Special Purpose Military Units and Military Reconnaissance Units" Знак отличия "Отличник службы в воинских частях специального назначения, разведывательных воинских частях"	№ 111	2018-04-02	Awarded to soldiers, sailors, sergeants and warrant-officers serving in special purpose military units and military reconnaissance units of the national guard for exemplary performance of operational (special) duties and excellence during combat training.
	Decoration "Excellent Service in Military Aviation Units" Знак отличия "Отличник службы в авиационных воинских частях"	№ 111	2018-04-02	Awarded to soldiers, sailors, sergeants and warrant-officers serving in military aviation units of the National Guard for exemplary performance of military duties and excellent operational performance.
	Decoration "Excellent Service in Military Naval Units" Знак отличия "Отличник службы в морских воинских частях"	№ 111	2018-04-02	Awarded to soldiers, sailors, sergeants and warrant-officers serving in military naval units of the National Guard for exemplary performance of military duties and excellent operational performance.
	Decoration "Excellent Service in Military Artillery Units" Знак отличия "Отличник службы в артиллерийских воинских частях"	№ 111	2018-04-02	Awarded to soldiers, sailors, sergeants and warrant-officers serving in military artillery units of the troops of the National Guard for exemplary performance of military duties and excellence during combat training.
	Decoration "Excellent Service in Military Engineering Units" Знак отличия "Отличник службы в инженерных воинских частях"	№ 111	2018-04-02	Awarded to soldiers, sailors, sergeants and warrant-officers serving in military engineering units of the troops of the National Guard for exemplary performance of military duties and excellence during combat training.
	Decoration "Excellent Service in Military Medical Units" Знак отличия "Отличник службы в медицинских воинских частях"	№ 111	2018-04-02	Awarded to soldiers, sailors, sergeants and warrant-officers serving in military medical units of the troops of the National Guard for exemplary performance of military duties and excellence during combat training.
	Decoration "Excellent Service in Financial and Economic Units" Знак отличия "Отличник службы в финансово-экономических подразделениях"	№ 111	2018-04-02	Awarded to soldiers, sailors, sergeants and warrant-officers serving in financial and economic units of the troops of the National Guard for exemplary performance of military duties and excellence during combat training.
	Decoration "Excellent Service in Organs of Management" Знак отличия "Отличник службы в органах управления"	№ 111	2018-04-02	Awarded to soldiers, sailors, sergeants and warrant-officers serving in managerial organs of the troops of the National Guard for exemplary performance of military duties and excellence during combat training.
	Decoration "Excellent Service in Units of Non-Departmental Security" Знак отличия "Отличник службы в организациях вневедомственной охраны"	№ 111	2018-04-02	Awarded to persons from among rank-and-file and junior commanding personnel serving in private security organizations of the National Guard and having special police ranks, for successes achieved in ensuring the protection of public order and public safety, as well as in ensuring the safety of individual property and of legal entities under contracts.
	Decoration "Excellent in Guard Service" Знак отличия "Отличник караульной службы"	№ 111	2018-04-02	Awarded to soldiers, sailors, sergeants and warrant-officers of the national Guard for exemplary performance of military duties, as well as initiative, diligence and distinction in the course of guarding.
	Decoration "Excellent in Military Service" 1st class Знак отличия "Отличник боевой службы" I степени	№ 111	2018-04-02	Awarded to soldiers, sailors, sergeants and warrant-officers of the National Guard in military service under contract in military units (formations) assigned to protect important state facilities, special cargoes, communications facilities: for exemplary performance of military duties in the absence of any unsatisfactory ratings and with at least 1000 “excellent” marks in military service while part of a guard detail; in military service under contract in special motorized military units (formations) of the troops of the National Guard, for exemplary performance of military duties in the absence of unsatisfactory ratings and at least 1000 "excellent" marks in military service as members of military units tasked with maintaining of public order.
	Decoration "Excellent in Military Service" 2nd class Знак отличия "Отличник боевой службы" II степени	№ 111	2018-04-02	Awarded to soldiers, sailors, sergeants and warrant-officers of the National Guard in military service under contract in military units (formations) assigned to protect important state facilities, special cargoes, communications facilities: for exemplary performance of military duties in the absence of any unsatisfactory ratings and with at least 500 “excellent” marks in military service while part of a guard detail; in military service under contract in special motorized military units (formations) of the troops of the National Guard, for exemplary performance of military duties in the absence of unsatisfactory ratings and at least 500 "excellent" marks in military service as members of military units tasked with maintaining of public order.
	Decoration "Excellent in Military Service" 3rd class Знак отличия "Отличник боевой службы" III степени	№ 111	2018-04-02	Awarded to soldiers, sailors, sergeants and warrant-officers of the National Guard in military service under contract in military units (formations) assigned to protect important state facilities, special cargoes, communications facilities: for exemplary performance of military duties in the absence of any unsatisfactory ratings and with at least 100 “excellent” marks in military service while part of a guard detail; in military service under contract in special motorized military units (formations) of the troops of the National Guard, for exemplary performance of military duties in the absence of unsatisfactory ratings and at least 100 "excellent" marks in military service as members of military units tasked with maintaining of public order.
	Commemorative breast badge "50th Anniversary of the Formation of the Central Museum of the National Guard Troops of the Russian Federation" Памятный нагрудный знак "50 лет со дня образования Центрального музея войск национальной гвардии Российской Федерации"	№ 211	2018-06-21	Awarded to military and civilian personnel performing military service (performing work activities) in the Central Command of the Troops of the National Guard for the conscientious performance of official duties; to military personnel, persons serving in the forces of the National Guard of the Russian Federation and having special police ranks, and to civilian personnel of the troops of the National Guard who previously performed military service, performed labour activities in the Troops of the National Guard, as well as to other persons who provided assistance to Troops of the National Guard in carrying out the tasks assigned to them and in the exercise of their vested authority.
	Commemorative breast badge "50 Years of the Establishment of State Permits and Licensing Units" Памятный знак "50 лет со дня образования подразделений государственного контроля и лицензионно-разрешительной работы"	№ 23	2019-01-23	Awarded to military personnel, persons serving in the forces of the National Guard with special police ranks, and civilian personnel (federal state civil servants and employees) of the forces of the National Guard, who have served (worked) impeccably for less than three years in calendar terms, in the licensing and permit units of organs of the Ministry of Internal Affairs of Russia and the National Guard; to citizens discharged from military service to the reserves (retirement), who have made a significant contribution to the performance of tasks and the exercise of the powers assigned to licensing and permit units; to persons assisting in the performance of tasks and the exercise of the powers vested in the licensing and permits units.
	Breast badge "For Distinction in Studies" 1st class Нагрудный знак "За отличие в учебе" I степени	№ 192	2019-06-01	Awarded to students of the federal State General Educational Institution "Moscow Presidential Cadet School M.A. Sholokhov” of the National Guard of the Russian Federation for achieving “excellent” final grades in all subjects for an academic year during two academic years.
	Breast badge "For Distinction in Studies" 2nd class Нагрудный знак "За отличие в учебе" II степени	№ 192	2019-06-01	Awarded to students of the federal State General Educational Institution "Moscow Presidential Cadet School M.A. Sholokhov” of the National Guard of the Russian Federation for achieving “good” or better final grades in all subjects for an academic year during two academic years.

== See also ==
- Awards and decorations of the Russian Federation
- Ministerial Awards of the Russian Federation
- List of awards of independent services of the Russian Federation
- Honorary titles of the Russian Federation
- Awards and decorations of the Soviet Union
- National Guard of Russia
- Internal Troops (Russia)
- Military history of the Russian Federation
