= National Guard of Russia =

Internal troops and military reserve force of the Russian Federation

Federal Service of Troops of the National Guard of the Russian Federation Федеральная служба войск национальной гвардии Российской Федерации
- Patch of the National Guard

- Emblem of the National Guard of Russia

- Badge of the National Guard

- Flag of the National Guard
- Common name: Росгвардия (Rosgvardiya) from Rossiyskaya (Russian) and gvardiya (Guard)
- Motto: Всегда на страже (Vsegda na strazhe); Always on guard

Agency overview
- Formed: 5 April 2016
- Preceding agencies: Internal Troops of Russia (1991–2016); OMON (1988–2016); SOBR (1992–2016)
- Employees: 340,000

Jurisdictional structure
- Federal agency (Operations jurisdiction): Russia
- Operations jurisdiction: Russia
- Population: 145 million
- Legal jurisdiction: Russian Federation
- Governing body: Security Council of Russia
- Constituting instrument: Federal Law No. 226-FZ of 03.07.2016
- General nature: Federal law enforcement; Gendarmerie
- Specialist jurisdictions: National border patrol, security, integrity; Paramilitary law enforcement, counter insurgency, riot control

Operational structure
- Headquarters: 9 Krasnokazarmennaya Street, Moscow
- Elected officer responsible: Vladimir Putin, President of Russia
- Agency executives: Viktor Zolotov, Director; Viktor Strigunov, First Deputy Director; Yury Yashin, Chief of the Main Staff; Oleg Plokhoi, State Secretary
- Parent agency: Security Council of Russia
- Child agency: National Guard Forces Command

Notables
- Significant Battles: Russo-Ukrainian War; •Russian invasion of Ukraine
- Anniversary: 27 March, National Guardsmen's Day

Website
- rosguard.gov.ru; en.rosguard.gov.ru

The Federal Service of Troops of the National Guard of the Russian Federation, (Note: Russian: Федеральная служба войск национальной гвардии Российской Федерации, romanized: Federalnaya sluzhba voysk natsionalnoy gvardii Rossiyskoy Federatsii) officially known as the Rosgvardiya (Russian: Росгвардия, lit. 'Rosguard / Rusguard'), is a federal executive body responsible for law enforcement, internal security, counterterrorism, and riot control.

The National Guard is an independent agency that reports directly to the president of Russia as Supreme Commander-in-Chief of the Russian Armed Forces and Chairman of the Russian Security Council. It is legally and structurally separate from the Armed Forces. As of 2018, the National Guard consisted of approximately 340,000 personnel in 84 units across Russia. It includes the forces of the former Internal Troops of Russia, SOBR, OMON, and other internal military forces outside the Russian Armed Forces.

The National Guard was established in 2016 by President Vladimir Putin through a law aimed at enhancing efficiency and avoiding duplication of responsibilities within the Russian security system, in response to strategic challenges faced by Russia. Its stated mission is to secure Russia's borders, take charge of gun control, combat terrorism and organized crime, protect public order and guard important state facilities. It is also used to suppress civil strife and attempts at so-called "color revolutions", domestically and abroad.

In 2017, President Putin designated 27 March as National Guard Day.

== History ==
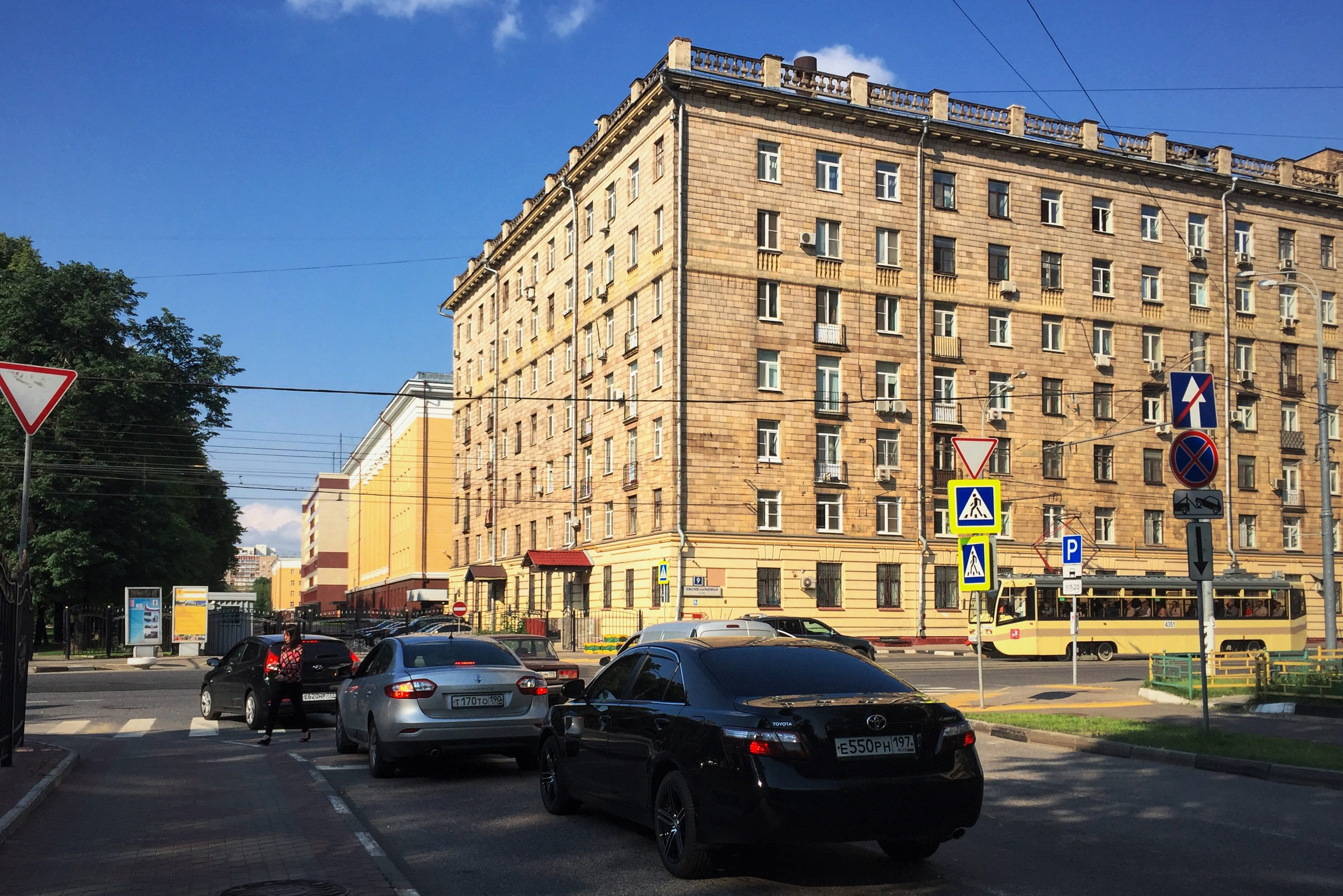
The entrance to the National Guard headquarters at 9 Krasnokazarmennaya Street in the South-Eastern Administrative Okrug of Moscow

The National Guard is a direct successor of the Internal Troops of the Soviet Union, the Internal Troops of Russia, the OMON, and the SOBR units formerly under the control of the Ministry of Internal Affairs.

The first iteration of a National Guard was proposed in 1991. It was supposed to consist of at least 11 brigades of 3,000 and 5,000 personnel each, with no more than 100,000 personnel in total. Its military units were to be deployed in 10 regions, including three brigades in Moscow, two in St. Petersburg, and several other important cities and regions in the country. It was meant to be a temporary measure; however, it was tabled by then-president Boris Yeltsin.

Plans to create a National Guard directly under the president's control, which would use personnel and resources from the Russian Airborne Troops, Air Force, Navy, and Military Police, as well as elements of Russia's Ministry of Emergency Situations, were first reported in April 2012.

The establishment of the National Guard reportedly caused contention within the Kremlin, since the new force took over duties and functions normally carried out by the Ministry of Internal Affairs. A spokesman denied that establishing the National Guard signaled a crisis of confidence in the siloviki and said that the Federal Guard Service would retain its role. He did not, however, comment on whether the then-incumbent heads of the Federal Drug Service and the Federal Migration Service would retain their posts.

=== Establishment ===
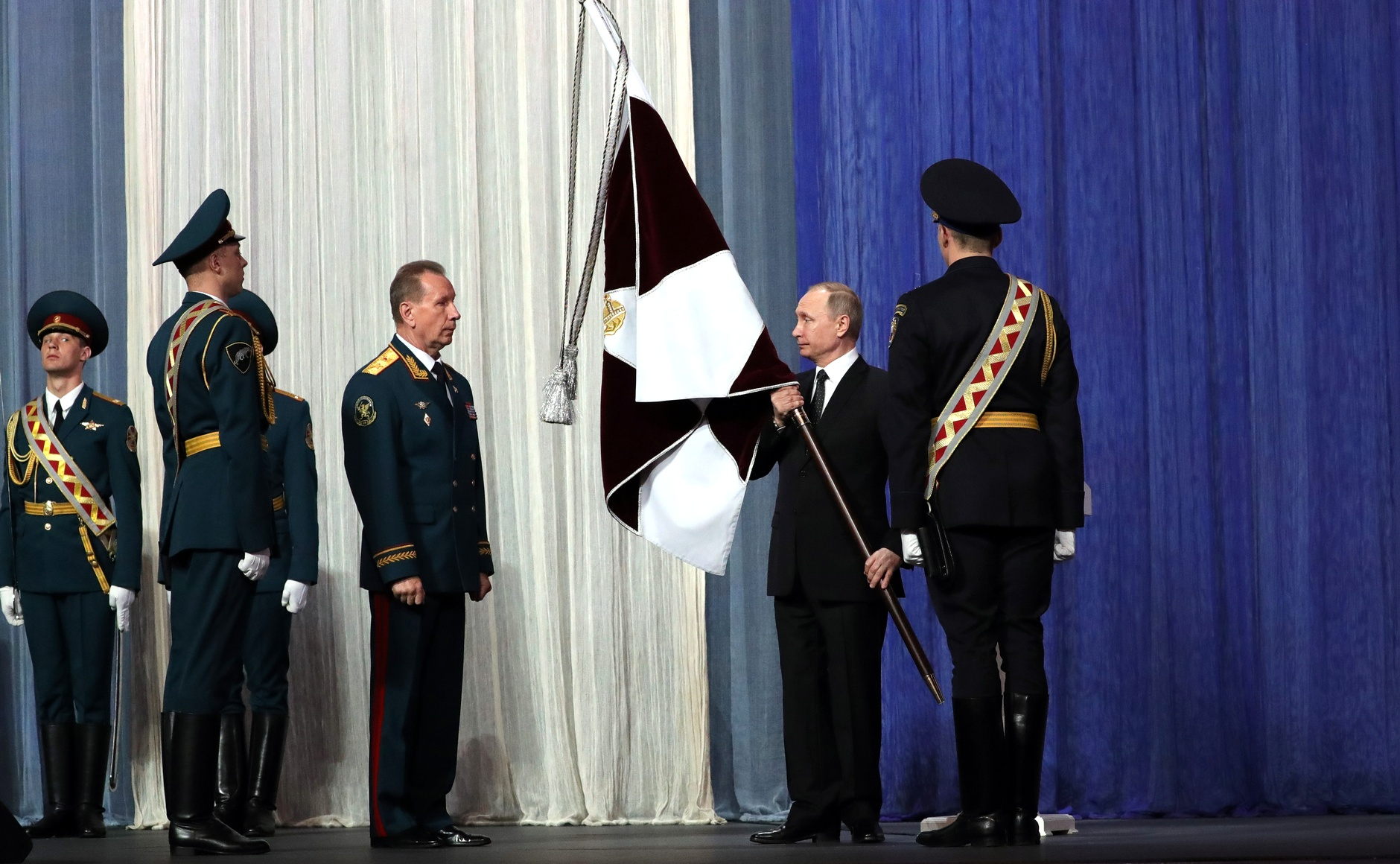
A national guard banner awarding ceremony, 27 March 2017

President Putin created the current iteration of the National Guard of Russia by Presidential Decree on 5 April 2016. The next day, Putin submitted a draft framework law for this new executive body titled "On the Russian National Guard Troops" to the State Duma. This was read and then passed on 18 May and 22 June 2026, respectively.

On 9 May 2016, 400 members of the National Guard participated in the Moscow Victory Day Parade for the first time. The first National Guardsmen to be enlisted took their military oaths on 1 June 2016.

According to National Guard Director Viktor Zolotov, the formation of the Russian National Guard took place in three stages. The first phase was the transformation of Interior Troops, OMON, and SOBR units into National Guard units. The second step involved developing the troops' organizational and staff structure, harmonizing regulations and assigning specific tasks to each unit. The third phase envisaged completing all organizational activities of the National Guard.

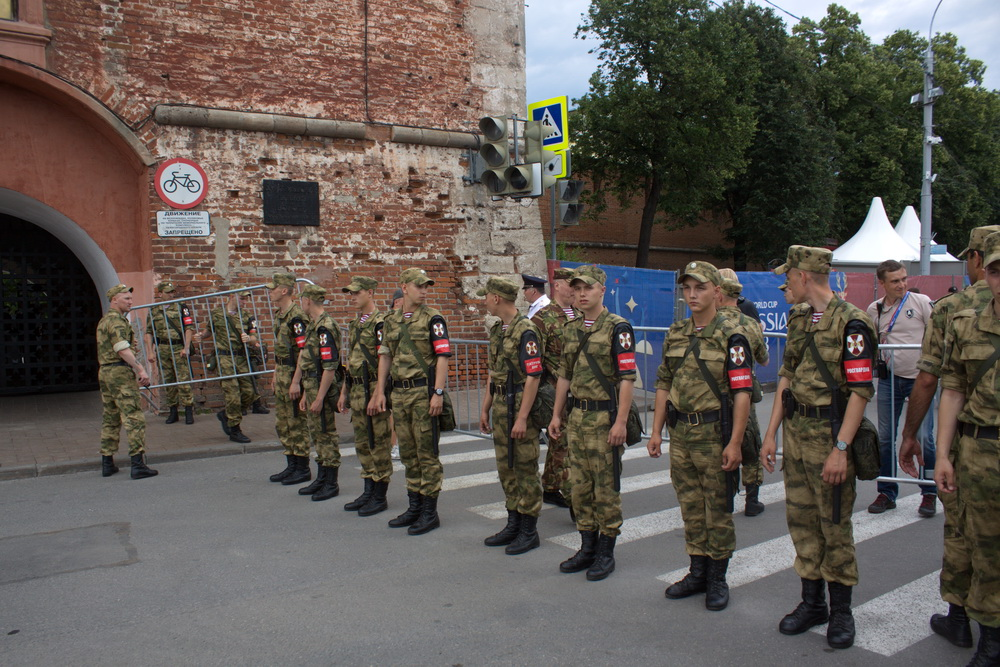
Soldiers of the National Guard providing security in Nizhny Novgorod during the 2018 FIFA World Cup

=== 2017–2021 ===
In early 2017, in support of the efforts of Vyacheslav Volodin, the Russian National Guard formed a new cyber-intelligence division. This was under the command of Larisa Goryachko, who was previously employed with the operational-search bureau of the Main Directorate of the Ministry of Internal Affairs of Russia for the Ural Federal District. Its purpose was to "monitor the activity of citizens in social networks, revealing cases of extremism there" over the entire internet, according to Rosbalt news agency.

In 2019, the National Guard's budget increased by 5%, from 111.9 billion rubles to about 117.5 billion rubles. During the same year, National Guardsmen from Saint Petersburg were apprehended after planting drugs on a 16-year-old. In February 2021, the National Guard silenced pro-Navalny protests in an attempt "to fend off threats to [the Putin regime's] political monopoly at any cost."

In late July 2021, the National Guard staged their first-ever strategic exercise simultaneously in every Russian federal district except the North Caucasian. On 21 November, the National Guard budget requests were classified.

=== Russian invasion of Ukraine ===
In early January and February 2022, reports emerged of National Guard detachments moving to the Russia–Ukraine border and Belarus, joining the "training exercise" happening during the 2021–2022 Russo-Ukrainian crisis.

When Russian forces invaded Ukraine on 24 February, National Guardsmen moved into Ukrainian territory, establishing themselves in occupied cities and towns reportedly for the purpose of suppressing the local population. The National Guard participated in combat operations against the Ukrainian military and the Ukrainian National Guard. Its units were deployed at the vanguard of the initial attack, suggesting that Russian forces did not expect much resistance from Ukrainian forces. As a result, the National Guard had to act as a regular combat force, and reports said it suffered heavy losses. Ukrainian forces destroyed and captured military columns carrying riot control equipment.

On 9 March, Ukraine claimed that the National Guard units moved in, arrested, and brutally beat close to 400 residents in Kherson after they peacefully protested against Russian occupation. While in the Ukrainian city of Nova Kakhovka, National Guard forces attempted to disperse a rally by using sting ball grenades and firing into the crowd with rubber bullets, resulting in one death.

On 13 March, the Chechen National Guard withdrew from Kyiv after suffering "hundreds" of casualties. (Note: Later that year, the Prosecutor General of Ukraine and National Police of Ukraine published CCTV footage showing National Guard personnel shooting at civilians during the Battle of Hostomel.) On the same day, Vox also reported that the National Guard helped repress the 2022 anti-war protests in Russia, dispersing rallies and arresting protestors. On 15 March, chief National Guardsman Viktor Zolotov, along with ten others in Russia's "Defense Enterprise," were sanctioned by the United States. All of them were added to the list of Specially Designated Nationals and Blocked Persons. On 17 March, National Guard Deputy Chief General Roman Gavrilov was fired due to the operational failures of the National Guard during the Russian invasion of Ukraine.

On 25 March, twelve guardsmen from Krasnodar deployed in Crimea were fired after they refused an order to cross the border on 25 February. The unit claimed that their duties were strictly limited to Russian territory and that they were not informed of possible "business trips" to Ukraine. Since they did not have their passports with them, they could not enter Ukrainian territory without violating Russian law. The guardsmen sued the National Guard for unfair dismissal and are appealing for reinstatement. According to their lawyer, Mikhail Benyash, after the case was publicized, almost a thousand National Guardsmen contacted him with similar cases.

On 27 May, 115 guardsmen from Nalchik, the capital of the Kabardino-Balkarian Republic, faced similar difficulties with foreign engagements because they were hired only to police domestic troubles and lacked military training. The lawsuit, drafted by a lawyer named Andrei Sabinin, surprised reporters and was discovered only because the soldiers appealed. The lawsuit was dismissed after the judge determined that the soldiers had been rightfully fired for "refusing to perform an official assignment" to fight in Ukraine and instead returned to a duty station.

On 2 June, National Guard Unit #6720 took part in the Bucha massacre, and at least ten of its members participated in looting "financial savings, jewelry, computers, household appliances, [and] linen." They later "sent these items by mail to their relatives in Russia." On 6 June, President Putin ordered a 5 million rubles life-insurance benefit payment to the families of members of the National Guard who died in Ukraine.

On 22 May 2023, it was reported that members of the National Guard would be deployed to defend Belgorod from the Freedom of Russia Legion.

=== 2023–Present ===
Since August 2023, the National Guard has been recruiting ex-Wagner convicts who served in Ukraine and could provide proof of their pardon. Recruitment of those who have breached Article 228 of the Criminal Code of Russia, however, requires special approval. On 13 November, it was reported that four former inmates who fought for the Wagner Group in eastern Ukraine had been receiving calls and text messages offering them military contracts. Three of the veterans reported that the National Guard specifically was trying to recruit them. Other reports indicate that former Wagner fighters have joined Chechen Akhmat units whilst still wearing Wagner patches.

In September 2025, the force’s chief Viktor Zolotov announced that the National Guard would reintroduce tank units.

== Mission and Powers ==
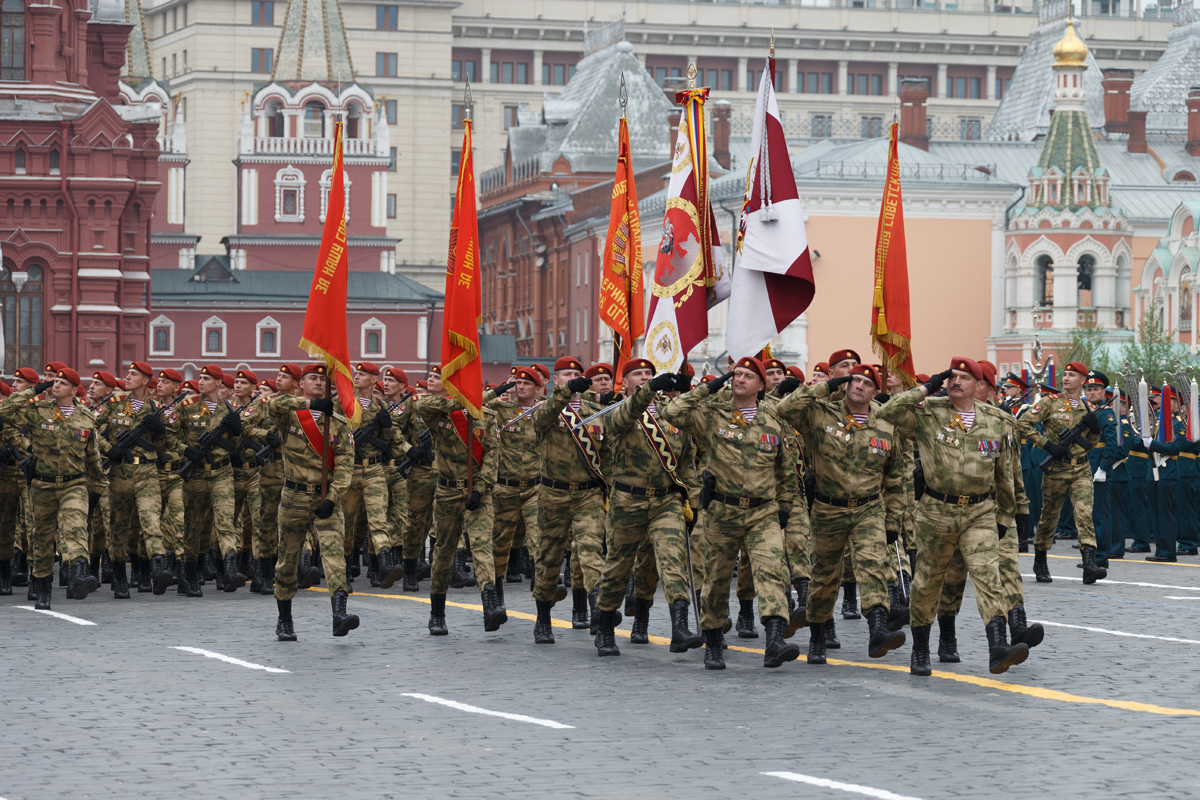
Russian National Guard military personnel on Red Square, 2019

The missions of the National Guard of Russia include joint operations to secure borders, fight terrorism and organized crime, perform functions carried out by riot and prison police, protect public safety and order, and guard important state facilities. The National Guard has powers over weapons transfers and the control of private security activities. According to President Putin, another major responsibility of the National Guard is the overseeing of various kinds of security provisions, authorization systems for firearm possession, private security firms, and the management of the interior troops.

The National Guard has the right to request federal, state, and local documents from authorities, officials, and citizens; suspend or limit the use of any communications networks and communications means in emergencies; and exercise the right to priority use of these communications networks and communications means.

According to the news agency TASS, the National Guard has powers similar to those exercised by the Federal Security Service. Specifically, the National Guard is controversially allowed to fire into crowds in a select number of situations, such as terrorist incidents, hostage situations, or if a government building secured by the National Guard comes under attack. However, the soldiers are forbidden in all circumstances from shooting at pregnant women, children, or people with disabilities. Troops can use physical force against direct threats to members of the public or fellow soldiers as well as to special cargo and structures along communications lines protected by National Guard troops and the National Guard troops' facilities. They can also open and search vehicles, check for identification documents, and detain citizens.

The National Guard can seal off areas, especially to prevent mass riots. They also have the authority to escort illegal foreign vessels in Russian territorial waters in the Kerch Strait to Russian ports. In a state of emergency, National Guard personnel have the right to ban traffic for vehicles and pedestrians, use citizens' cars to reach the scene of an emergency or chase criminals, enter houses, and use force, special means, and/or weapons. Under the law, National Guard troops carry out their activities based on the principles of legality, observance of the rights and freedoms of individuals and citizens, single authority, and centralized control. As per Gordon M. Hahn, the National Guard's rapid reaction forces, special operational forces, and aviation remain under the MVD's operational command.

=== Subordination, organization and tasks related to defense ===
According to Aleksandr Golts of the Jamestown Foundation, the President of Russia may transfer military units and formations of the Armed Forces of the Russian Federation, as well as other military formations, to the National Guard's operational control. Conversely, it is also possible to transfer units of the National Guard to the Russian military. The National Guard of Russia's territorial units must always act in collaboration with the Russian military and other federal and territorial bodies in accordance with the federal constitution and laws, under decrees and orders of the President of the Russian Federation.

All territorial unit boundaries of the National Guard must be created on the proposal of a commander of the National Guard, agreed with by the Ministry of Defense, and then approved by the President.

== Organization and leadership ==
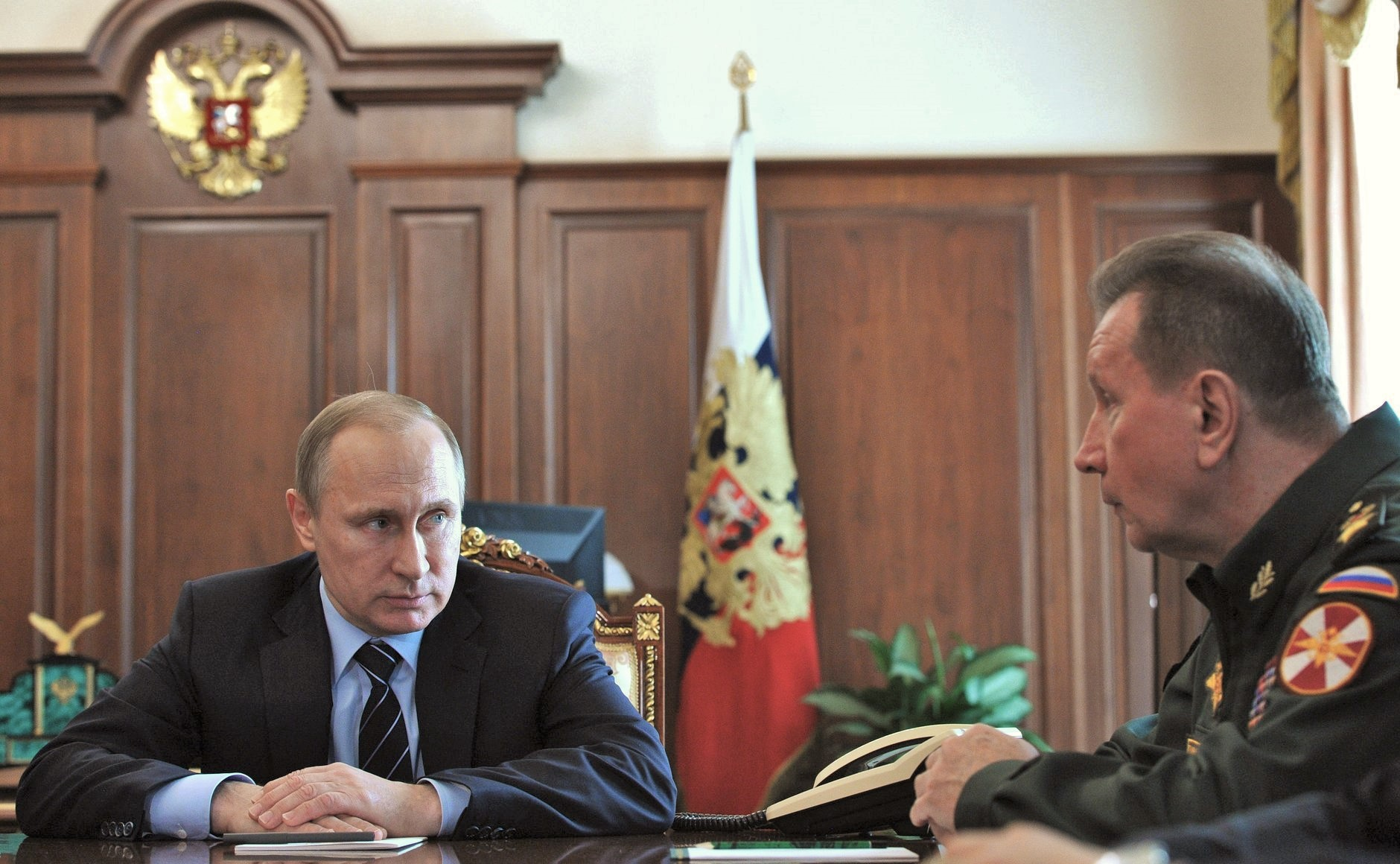
Vladimir Putin and National Guard Director Viktor Zolotov, 5 April 2016

The National Guard of Russia is directly subordinated to the supreme commander-in-chief, and the incumbent head is a permanent member of the Security Council.

The National Guard itself includes Interior Ministry troops, service members of the Russian Armed Forces, and Ministry of Emergency Situations personnel such as firefighters and rescue workers. It has also taken over functions previously managed by the OMON riot police and SOBR rapid-reaction forces.

The National Guard was expected to number some 350,000 to 400,000 men. As of May 2016, however, the Russian government did not propose the size of the forces actually needed. On 20 April 2016, National Guard Director Zolotov stated that the National Guard of Russia will not appoint employees with low moral and professional qualities who have committed defamatory acts.

=== Top leadership ===
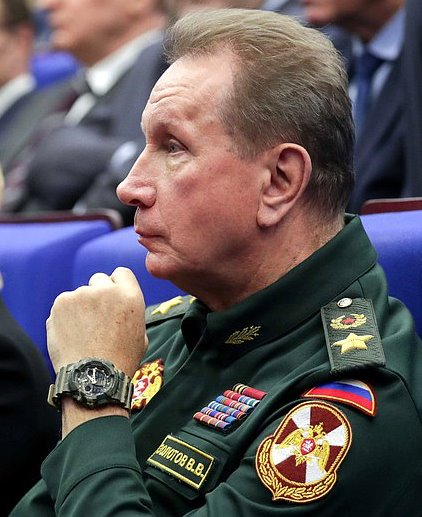
The emblem of the National Guard can be seen in an embroidered patch on the arm of the first Director of the National Guard, Viktor Zolotov

According to the establishing presidential decree, the National Guard is part of the executive branch, which is headed by the president of Russia. The National Guard is led by a "director," who has six deputy directors, including a first deputy director who is simultaneously Chief of Staff of the National Guard and a "state secretary/deputy director".

On 5 April 2016, Viktor Zolotov was appointed as the Director of the Federal National Guard Service and Commander of the National Guard Forces Command. On 20 May, newly promoted Colonel General Sergei Chenchik was appointed as Chief of the General Staff and First Deputy Director of the Russian Federal National Guard Service. According to the official website, other top positions include those of Commander of the Troops of the National Guard of the Russian Federation, held in 2016 by Oleg Borukayev and Sergei Yerygin.

=== Cyber unit ===
According to Sergey Sukhankin of the Jamestown Foundation, the National Guard includes a special cybersecurity and intelligence unit tasked with monitoring and analyzing online social networks.

=== Districts ===
The National Guard's territorial organization consists of eight National Guard Districts, each named after its corresponding federal district. The only exception is the Eastern National Guard District, which handles military units stationed in the Far Eastern Federal District. In addition, the Central and Northwestern National Guard Districts have honorific titles included in their full names. Each district can be further subdivided into brigades and has the same boundaries, names, and headquarters as those of the former Internal Troops.

Police officers are appointed as heads of the National Guard Districts, while military officers are appointed as chiefs of staff. Districts of the Federal National Guard Troops Service directly operate task forces and military units, and carry out other National Guard missions, as well as region-level territorial units such as main administration departments, local administration structures, and other departments.

The National Guard Districts are the:

- Central Orsha-Khingan Order of Zhukov Red Banner National Guard District, headquartered in Moscow under Colonel General Igor Golloyev
- Northwestern Order of the Red Star National Guard District, headquartered in Saint Petersburg under Colonel General Pavel Dashkov
- Volga National Guard District, headquartered in Nizhny Novgorod under Colonel General Aleksandr Poryadin
- Southern National Guard District, headquartered in Rostov-on-Don under Colonel General Oleg Kozlov
- North Caucasian National Guard District, headquartered in Pyatigorsk under Colonel General Sergei Zakharov
- Ural National Guard District, headquartered in Yekaterinburg under Colonel General Aleksandr Popov
- Siberian National Guard District, headquartered in Novosibirsk under Lieutenant General Nikolai Markov
- Eastern National Guard District, headquartered in Khabarovsk under Lieutenant General Kurbonali Safarov

=== Educational organizations ===
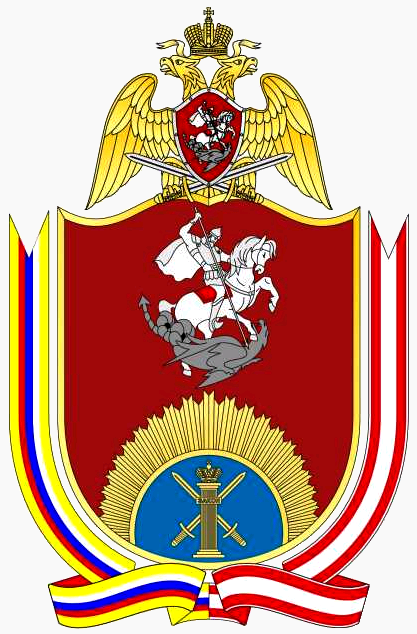
Emblem of the Saratov Military Institute of the National Guard Troops of the Russian Federation

The educational organizations of the National Guard operate directly under the Director of the National Guard.

==== St. Petersburg National Guard Forces Command Military Institute ====
Located in St. Petersburg, the National Guard Forces Command Military Institute serves as the training facility for National Guard Forces Command personnel, including officers, warrant officers, and non-commissioned officers. It was established on 4 September 1947 as the MVD Central School and has since undergone several name changes before adopting its current title in 2016.

==== Saratov Institute of the National Guard ====
Located in Saratov, the Saratov Institute of the National Guard trains officers for service in the National Guard.

==== Perm Military Institute of the National Guard ====
The Perm Military Institute is the only military educational institution of the National Guard that provides professional education across eight different specialties.

==== Moscow Presidential Cadets School ====
The Moscow National Guard Presidential Cadets School is a pre-university specialized educational institution of the National Guard. It was opened on 2 September 2002 in the Southeast Administrative District of Moscow in the Kuzminki district.

== Uniform ==
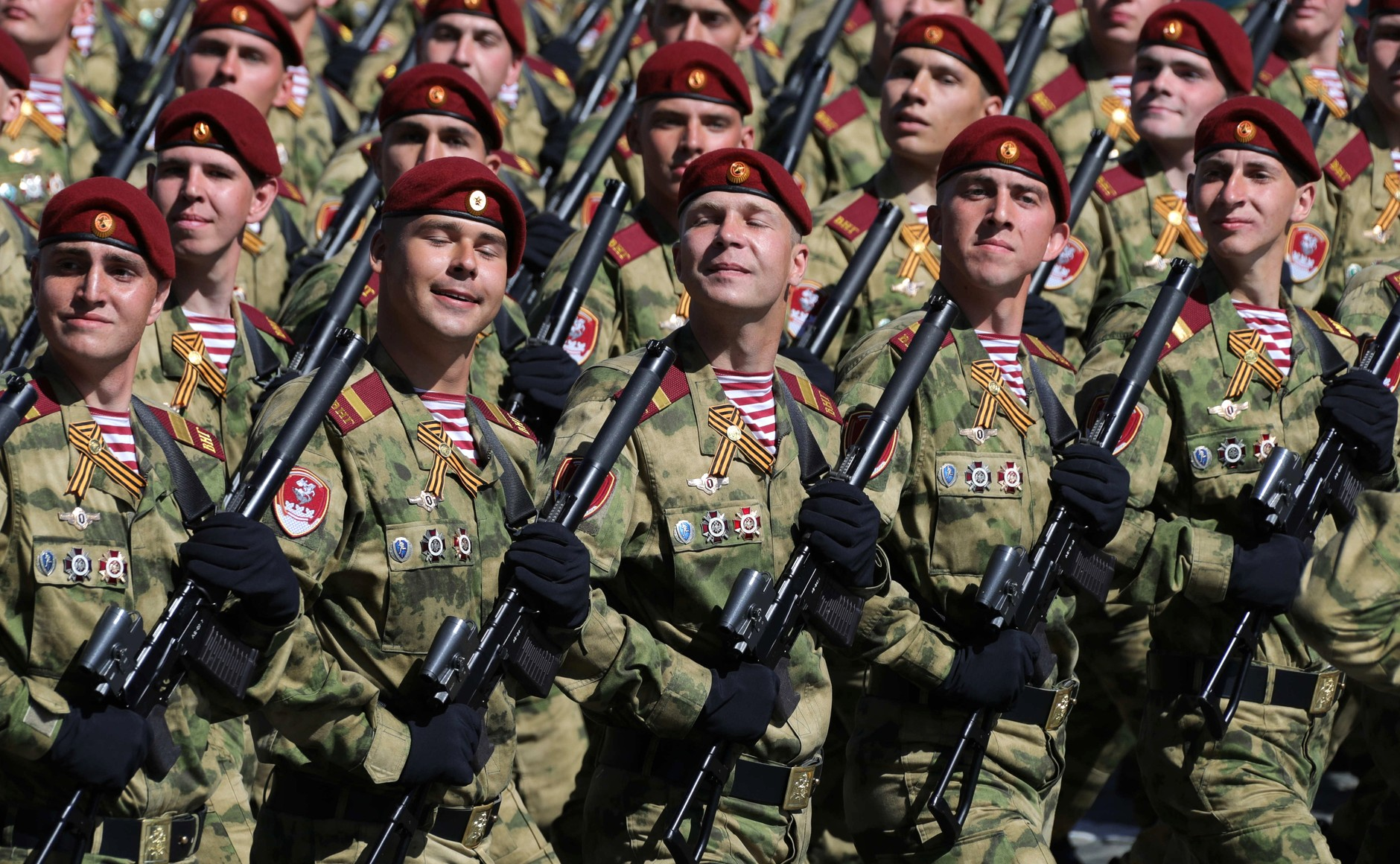
National Guard troops in the 2018 Moscow Victory Day Parade

Before their uniform reforms, some units of the National Guard wore blue and green variants of various Russian camouflage, such as the Police of Russia's tiger stripe camouflage and KLMK, during urban policing. By 2018, ATACS FG and SURPAT had become the National Guard's primary camouflage variants, effectively retiring older systems like Kamysh Tigerstripe and KLMK. The Russian National Guard uses blue variants of FG and SURPAT for urban policing within Russia, whereas the green variants are reserved for combat deployments.

== Equipment ==
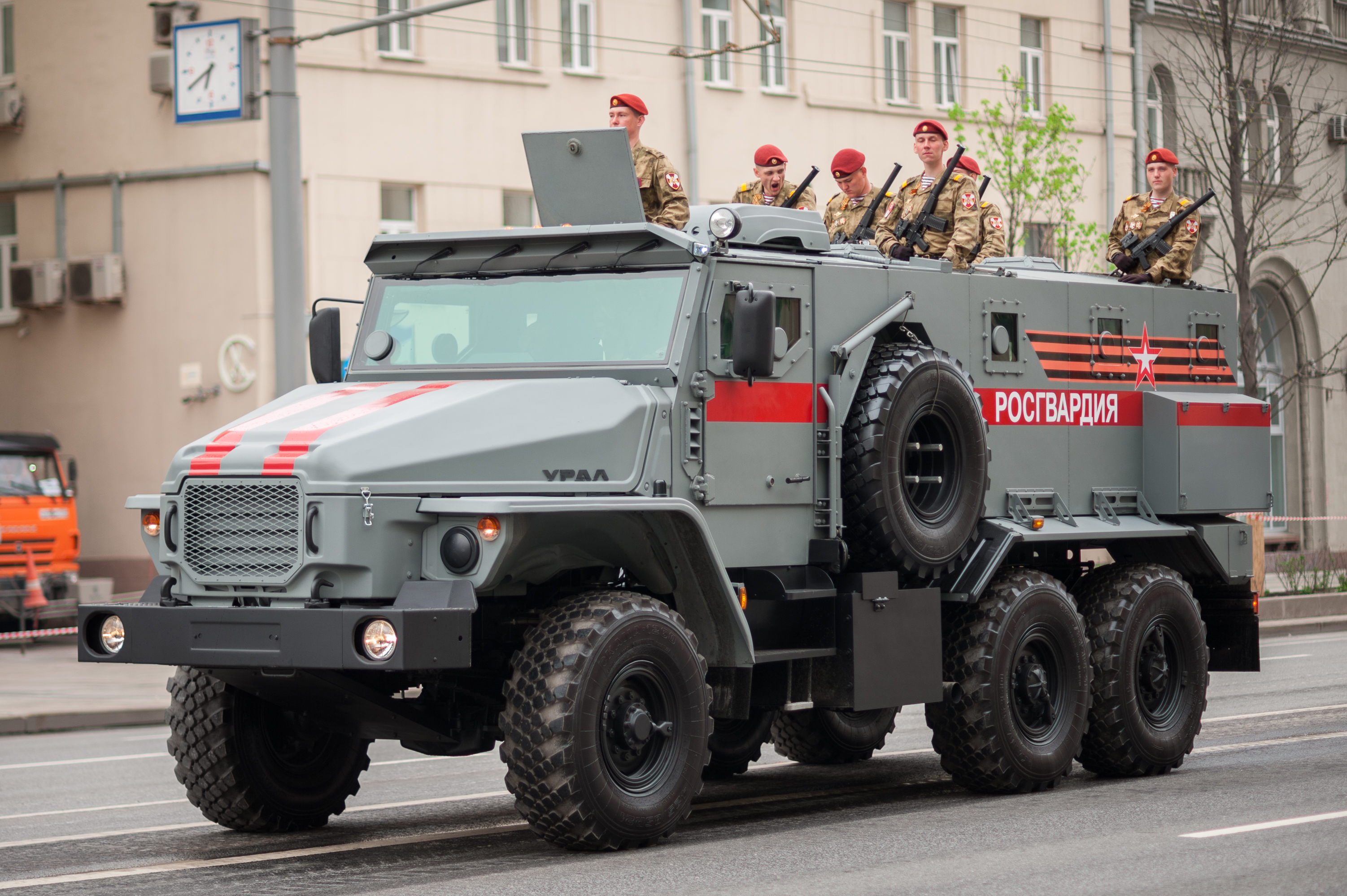
National guardsmen crewing a Ural-4320VV during the 2018 Moscow Victory Day Parade

The National Guard has the same equipment as the former Internal Troops. The AK-200 and AK-205 assault rifle variants are the primary service weapon of the Russian National Guard. Special operations units attached to the National Guard are armed with AS Val subsonic suppressed assault rifles. They also possess non-lethal weapons and weapons against underwater sabotage forces.

On 4 August 2023, Russian President Vladimir Putin signed a federal law giving the National Guard the right to have heavy weapons. Deliveries of tanks, artillery, and mortars reportedly began in May 2024. Russian Deputy Prime Minister Denis Manturov stated in February 2026 that the state defense order for the National Guard increased by almost 50% over the past year.

== Domestic and international reactions ==
The establishment of the Russian Federal National Guard Service triggered several domestic and international reactions and assessments, with attempts to interpret and explain the move, ranging from power games to plans to prevent "color revolutions".

=== Analysis ===
With the timing of President Putin's creation of this National Guard force coming ahead of the 2016 parliamentary election to the State Duma in Russia and crashing oil prices, Pavel Felgengauer, an independent military analyst based in Moscow, said this new force is "a kind of Praetorian Guard to deal with the internal enemy" and further stated "It reminds me of the decline and fall of the Roman Empire. We see an aging emperor appointing his bodyguard chief of everything." Mark Galeotti, professor at New York University, wrote in a post on his blog, In Moscow's Shadows, that "[National Guard] forces have little real role fighting crime or terrorism; they are public security forces, riot and insurrection control and deterrence assets."

Konstantin Gaaze, a Moscow-based political analyst and journalist with the Carnegie Moscow Center, said this new force was "linked to the election cycle" and that "Putin wants to make sure the situation that took place on the Maidan, in Ukraine, won't happen in Russia." Gaaze further said that Putin's creation of the National Guard created a counterbalance not only to the Federal Security Forces, but also to the Russian Army itself, and Defense Minister Sergei Shoigu stated, "The newly established National Guard is the president's army in the literal sense of the word. An army, which can be used without intermediaries in the form of a defense minister and without the constitutional rules on the use of the Armed Forces."

Ella Paneyakh, senior researcher for the Department of Political Science and Sociology at the European University at Saint Petersburg, said this new National Guard force was not just another law enforcement agency, but another army with the right to conduct military operations against the country's citizens. Russian political scientist Gleb Pavlovsky, who heads the analytics department of the Center for Political Technologies (CPT), said Putin created the National Guard to counter the power of Chechen leader Ramzan Kadyrov. Tatiana Stanovaya, who heads the Center for Political Technologies (CPT) in France, in commenting on Viktor Zolotov's appointment to head the National Guard, said, "The unnecessary link, that of a minister between the commander-in-chief and the head of the National Guard, is removed. Whoever the minister is, a brother, friend, classmate or judo coach, his hand may tremble when you need him to execute an order. Zolotov is protected from those fluctuations as much as possible."

Researcher Gordon M. Hahn for The Duran deemed the probability of a "palace coup" minor compared to other scenarios, saying that the National Guard is an added insurance against a regime split, palace coup, or other elite politics. Another "power game"-related reason may be, according to Hahn, the will to reduce the power of Chechen leader Ramzan Kadyrov.

=== National Guard as a tool against strategic destabilization ===
According to Roger McDermott of The Jamestown Foundation, the National Guard was established to counter future color revolutions and to link foreign and domestic threat assessments into a seamless web. McDermott links the corps' origins to experience gained during internal crises and power games among key actors in the 1990s, as well as to future color revolutions abroad, especially near Russia's borders and in the Middle East. In this view, the 2016–2017 election cycle in Russia provided a domestic context for the timing of the 2016 reform aimed at countering a strategic threat, but the deeper reason does not lie in the elections themselves.

Gordon M. Hahn lists possible reasons behind the establishment of the National Guard, including inter-departmental tension, violent conflict, and even armed clashes under conditions of potential greater instability. According to former Federal Security Service Director and Russian Parliament Member Nikolai Kovalyov, the establishment of the National Guard was important amid NATO's eastward expansion.

== Media ==
The National Guard of Russia has publishes the full-color magazine In the Line of Duty for their troops. It covers matters of the corps' service activity, as well as history and literature. The media is not allowed to report on the location of National Guard soldiers, to "protect the safety of the troops and their families."

== See also ==
- Special Corps of Gendarmes
- Internal Troops of Russia
- National Guard Forces Command
- National Guard Naval Service Corps
- Awards of the National Guard of the Russian Federation
- Police of Russia
