= Federal Chamber of Advocates of Russian Federation =

Bar association in Russia

- Founded: 31 January 2003
- Type: Bar association
- Purpose: Advocacy, public representation, education and networking
- Headquarters: Moscow, Russia
- Location: Sivtsev Vrazhek Alley 43
- Region served: Russia
- Official language: Russian
- Leader: Svetlana Volodina
- Main organ: All-Russian Congress of Advocates
- Website: https://www.fparf.ru

The Federal Chamber of Advocates of the Russian Federation (Russian: Федеральная палата адвокатов Российской Федерации) is a Russian non-governmental organization which unites regional advocates' chambers (equivalent to regional bar associations) on the basis of mandatory membership. The Federal Chamber of Advocates of the Russian Federation is the lawyers' self-regulatory body in Russia, established to carry out a representation of the interests of lawyers in state bodies, local government bodies, a coordination of the activities of regional advocates' chambers, a developing of professional standards of legal practice. It is analogous to national bar associations such as the American Bar Association.

The Federal Chamber of Advocates of the Russian Federation is an observer member of the Council of Bars and Law Societies of Europe.

== History ==
The Federal Chamber of Advocates of the Russian Federation was founded at the First All-Russian Congress of Advocates on 31 January 2003 and was included into the Russian Unified State Register of legal entities on 17 March 2003. It is governed by the Federal Law of 31 May 2002 No.63-FZ "About advocate's activity and advocate's community in Russian Federation".

== Place in advocate's community of Russia ==
The Russian term "адвокатура" means a common set of advocates, advocate's law firms, regional advocate's chambers and the Federal Chamber of Advocates of the Russian Federation interacting with each other under the Federal Law of 31 May 2002 No.63-FZ. It can be translated into English as "advocate's community". The advocate's community is a civil society institute which is separated from public and local authorities and is operating independently on the basis of the self-governing.

31 May is celebrated as the Day of Russian advocate's community.

== Organizational structure ==
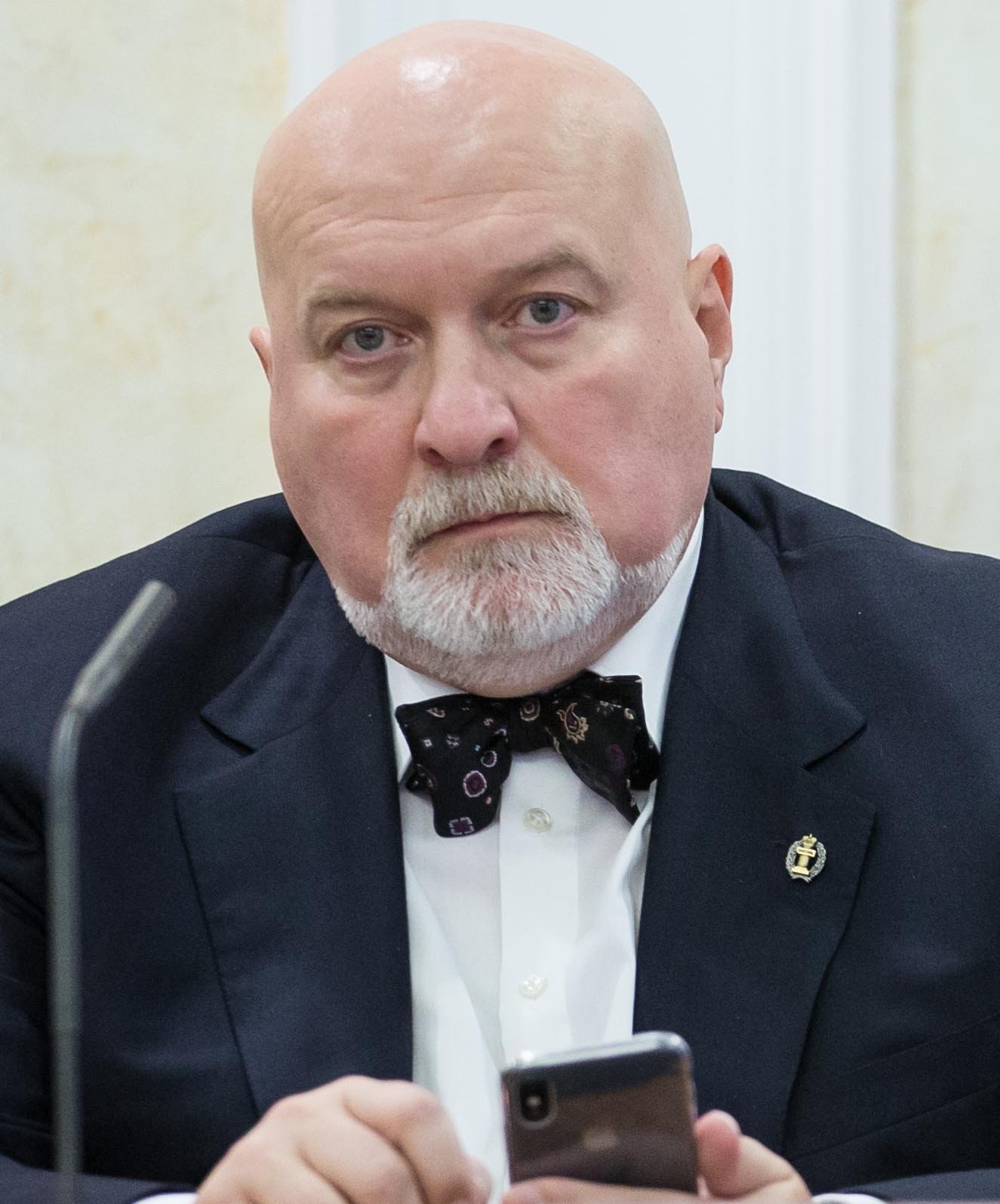
Yuriy Pilipenko, former President of the Federal Chamber of Advocates of the Russian Federation

The All-Russian Congress of Advocates, which is convened not less than once every two years, is a supreme management body of the Federal Chamber of Advocates of the Russian Federation.

The Council of the Federal Chamber of Advocates of the Russian Federation is a collegiate executive body of the Federal Chamber of Advocates of the Russian Federation. The Council consists of 33 members who elect the President of the Federal Chamber of Advocates of the Russian Federation from among their number.

The Audit Commission of the Federal Chamber of Advocates of the Russian Federation is a control after financially economic activity body.

The Ethics and Standards Commission of the Federal Chamber of Advocates of the Russian Federation is a body developing of professional standards of advocate's activity and norms of advocate's ethics. Also this commission hears appeals against a decisions of councils of regional advocate's chambers on disciplinary cases.

The Commission for the Defence of Rights of Advocates of the Federal Chamber of Advocates of the Russian Federation is a body protecting professional rights of advocates.

== Print media outlets ==
The Federal Chamber of Advocates of the Russian Federation publishes the following print magazines and journals:

- Вестник Федеральной палаты адвокатов Российской Федерации (English: The Federal Chamber of Advocates of the Russian Federation Bulletin) (ISSN 2072–3660)
- Адвокатская газета (English: Advocate’s Magazine) (ISSN 2619–1520)
- Российский адвокат (English: Russian Advocate) (ISSN 1025–7225)

== Integrated Information System of Advocate's Community of Russia ==
The Federal Chamber of Advocates of the Russian Federation is an operator of the Integrated Information System of Advocate's Community of Russia (Russian: Комплексная информационная система адвокатуры России) that provides functioning of electronic workflows between the Federal Chamber of Advocates of the Russian Federation, regional advocates' chambers, advocate's law firms, separate advocates, and also allows all of them to interact with courts and other state bodies in electronic form.

== Federal Chamber's awards ==
The Federal Chamber of Advocates of the Russian Federation grants the following awards to Russian advocates:

- Order "For devotion to advocate's duty"
- Order "For service to advocate's community"
- Emperor Alexander II Medal
- Medal "For merit in the protection of rights and freedoms of citizens" (I class and II class)
- Honorary charter
- Written commendation

== See also ==
- Bar of Ireland
- Bar of Northern Ireland
- Faculty of Advocates
- Portuguese Bar Association
- Swedish Bar Association
