= 604th Special Purpose Center =

Russian special operations forces unit

604th Special Purpose Center "Vityaz" 604 Центр специального назначения "Витязь"
- 604 Центр специального назначения внутренних войск
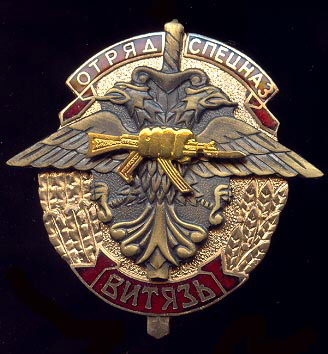
- Emblem of the 604th Special Purpose Center
- Active: 1 September 2008-present
- Country: Russia
- Branch: National Guard of Russia
- Type: Spetsnaz
- Role: Air assault Anti-tank warfare Artillery observer Bomb disposal CBRN defense Clandestine operation Close-quarters combat Cold-weather warfare Counter-revolutionary; Counterterrorism; Covert operation Crowd control Direct action Executive protection Force protection Hostage rescue HUMINT; Internal security Irregular warfare Law enforcement Long-range penetration Maneuver warfare Manhunt; Mountain warfare Parachuting; Patrolling; Raiding; Reconnaissance; Special operations Special reconnaissance Tracking; Urban warfare
- Part of: Separate Operational Purpose Division
- Garrison/HQ: Moscow
- Beret colour: Maroon

Commanders
- Current commander: Colonel Alexey Stromakov

The 604th Red Banner Special Purpose Centre "Vityaz" is a spetsnaz unit of the National Guard of Russia (Rosgvardiya) that responding to especially dangerous and high-risk situations such as counter-revolutionary, counterterrorism, direct action, escort high-ranking government officials in dangerous situations or areas, high-risk law enforcement situations, hostage rescue, irregular warfare, operating in difficult-to-access and dangerous areas, providing security important government buildings and infrastructure in time of crisis, serving high-risk arrest and search warrants, special operations in dangerous areas, special reconnaissance for gathering tactical field intelligence, and supporting crowd control operations during confession plans or meeting. The 604th Special Purpose Center's missions are primarily domestic operations, very few are sent on military or paramilitary police missions outside the country (if not really necessary).

== History ==
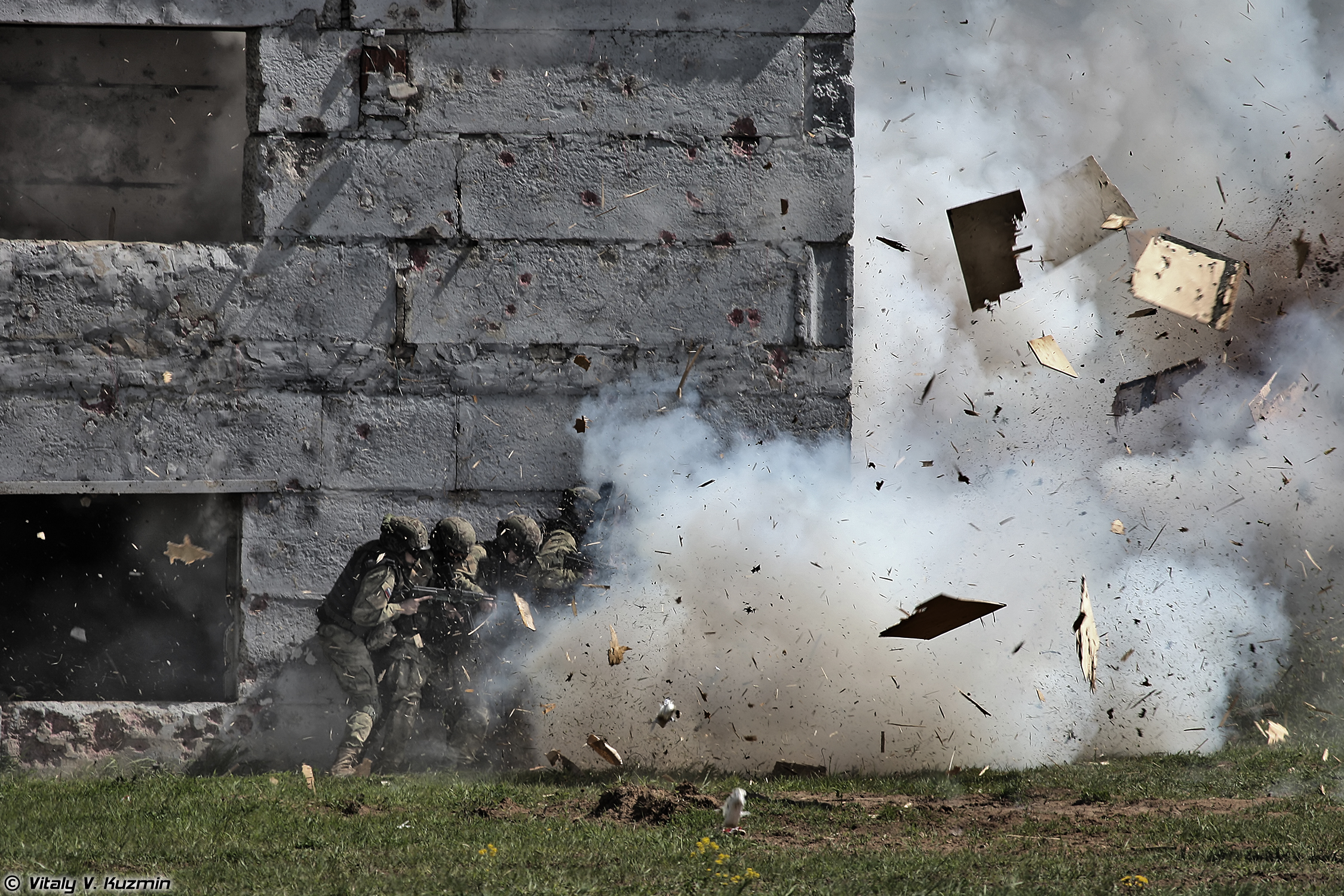
Operators from 604th Special Purpose Center Vityaz of National Guard Troops assault a building with suspects.

The history of the 604th Red Banner Special Purpose Centre "Vityaz" tracks back to the 1970s when, in preparation for the 1980 Moscow Olympics, an elite unit was formed. The personnel was drawn from the Separate Operational Purpose Division troops, and was trained with spetsnaz tactics. The core of this group later became the "Vityaz" unit.

During the 1989 crisis in Nagorno-Karabakh, the unit was expanded: from the special purpose training Company it was upgraded into a Battalion, and later the special purpose unit Vityaz was established.

The spetsnaz unit "Rus'" was created on 1 August 1994; it may track its roots from the 4th Battalion of the Soviet OMSBON, the Independent Motorized Infantry Battalion of Special Purpose, later renamed ODON. The dedicated role of the Rus' unit was clandestine operation, counter-revolutionary, counterterrorism, direct action, hostage rescue, internal security, irregular warfare, providing security important government buildings and infrastructure, and special operations in times of crisis, but actively participated in military and paramilitary operations in Chechnya and the broader North Caucasus region along with other MVD units, such as Vityaz.

After the collapse of the USSR, the North Caucasus became the main point of missions for MVD spetsnaz units.

The 604th Special Purpose Centre was established on 1 September 2008, by merging OMSN "Vityaz" and OMSN "Rus'" spetsnaz units of the Internal Troops of the Ministry of Internal Affairs. With the establishment of the 604th Special Purpose Centre, subunits for specialised tasks as mine-warfare, parachuting, climbing and diving training were established. The Center itself is the recipient of the Order of Kutuzov.

On 5 April, 2016, the National Guard of Russia was established, resulting in the dissolution of the Interior Troops of Russia and the transfer of command of most armed forces under the MVD to the National Guard.

== Mission ==
Forces of the 604th Special Purpose Centre are focused on rural actions and operations, such as clandestine operation, commando style raids, escort high-ranking government officials in dangerous situations or areas, gathering tactical field intelligence, high-risk law enforcement and tactical operation situations, hostage rescue, irregular warfare, liquidation of terrorist cells, long-range penetration, maneuver warfare, special operations in dangerous areas, and special reconnaissance. However, large scale counterterrorism and hostage rescue operations usually involve OMON, SOBR, Spetsnaz GRU, and Spetsnaz FSB units due to the large personnel demands.

== See also ==
- Spetsnaz
- Separate Operational Purpose Division
- SOBR
- National Guard Forces Command
