= Separate Operational Purpose Division =

Russian National Guard division

- Отдельная орденов Жукова, Ленина и Октябрьской Революции Краснознамённая дивизия оперативного назначения Войск национальной гвардии Российской Федерации им. Ф. Е. Дзержинского; ODON
- Active: 17 June 1924 – present
- Country: Russia
- Branch: Internal Troops (until 2016); National Guard (since 2016)
- Type: Motorized infantry
- Role: Protection of public order
- Size: ~18,000
- Part of: Soviet Ministry of Internal Affairs (until 1991): Internal Troops of the Soviet Union; Russian Ministry of Internal Affairs (until 2016): Internal Troops of Russia; National Guard of Russia (since 2016): National Guard Forces Command
- Garrison/HQ: Reutov; Balashikha
- Nickname: Felix Dzerzhinsky Division
- Mottos: "At any time, any place - any task!"
- March: "My Division"
- Anniversaries: June 17
- Engagements: World War II; Winter War; Tbilisi tragedy; 1991 Soviet coup attempt; Russian constitutional crisis of 1993; First Chechen War; Second Chechen War; Peace enforcement; Sumgait pogrom; Baku pogrom; Nagorno-Karabakh conflict; Osh riots; First South Ossetian War; War in Abkhazia; Wagner Group rebellion
- Decorations: Order of Lenin; Order of the October Revolution; Order of the Red Banner; Order of Zhukov; Order of Suvorov

Commanders
- Current commander: Major General Nikolai Kuznetsov

The Separate Operational Purpose Division (ODON; Russian: Отдельная дивизия оперативного назначения, romanized: Otdel'naya diviziya operativnogo naznacheniya) or OMSDON (a.k.a. Dzerzhinsky Division), is a rapid deployment internal security division of the Internal Troops of the Ministry of Internal Affairs of the USSR and then the Internal Troops of the Ministry of Internal Affairs, currently part of the National Guard Forces Command of the National Guard of the Russian Federation.

== USSR ==
The precursor to the ODON was the 1st Automobile Fighting Detachment of the VTsIK (Russian: 1-й автобоевой отряд) which was created in February 1918. The detachment was tasked with guarding the members of the VTsIK and the Sovnarkom and providing them with passenger cars. After the relocation of the government to Moscow in March 1918, it was assigned to guarding the Kremlin, along with the Red Latvian Riflemen and later the "Kremlin cadets" (Russian: Кремлёвские курсанты). The detachment was renamed 1st Armored Car Detachment 'Ya. M. Sverdlov' in 1919, and was transferred to VChK in 1921. At the peak of its strength, the detachment had over 400 troops.

In April 1921, VChK created the OSNAZ battalion which consisted of 1st Armored Car Detachment, three rifle platoons, a cavalry squadron, and various auxiliary units, with a total strength of some 1,100 men. VChK became OGPU in 1922, and the OSNAZ was renamed accordingly.

On 17 June 1924, the OSNAZ battalion, an OGPU rifle battalion and an OGPU rifle regiments formed the Special-Purpose Division (DON) of the OGPU Troops. The DON included 4 rifle regiments with an Armored Car detachment. In August 1926, the division was renamed Special-Purpose Division 'F. E. Dzerzhinsky' of the OGPU Troops. Throughout 1926, one more regiment and five more battalions joined the DON, raising its total strength to some 4,500 troops.

In 1929, the DON was reorganized as a full army division. In 1931, the Armoured Car detachment was reorganized into an armoured regiment. In 1934, OGPU was transferred to the People's Commissariat for Internal Affairs (the NKVD). The division fought on the front lines of the Winter War against Finland.

With the onset of World War II, parts of the division participated in the Battle of Moscow; the remaining unit guarded particularly important installations of the capital, patrolled the streets, and were involved in efforts to liquidate enemy infiltrator groups near the front and in the city.

Along with participation in hostilities, division elements in Moscow detained 485 enemy intelligence agents, 69,753 deserters, and over 320,000 offenders of the established regime.

The division took part in the 1941 October Revolution Parade on Moscow's Red Square.

In the battle against German troops, the snipers of the 4 Cavalry Regiment (later four motorized infantry) distinguished themselves. On the first deployment of the two sniper Regiments in 1942, they killed 853 German soldiers and officers. In total, in 1942 sniper division has killed 6,440 German soldiers and officers.

The OMSDON units protected the Allied leaders during the Yalta Conference.

In preparation for the 1980 Moscow Olympics, an elite group of OMSDON troops was trained with special forces tactics; the core of this group later became the Vytyaz unit. The final USSR designation of the division was OMSDON (Independent Special-Purpose Motorized Rifle Division of the Internal Troops of the MVD of the Soviet Union 'F. E. Dzerzhinsky', Russian: ОМСДОН, Отдельная мотострелковая дивизия особого назначения ВВ МВД им. Ф. Е. Дзержинского).

== Russian Federation ==
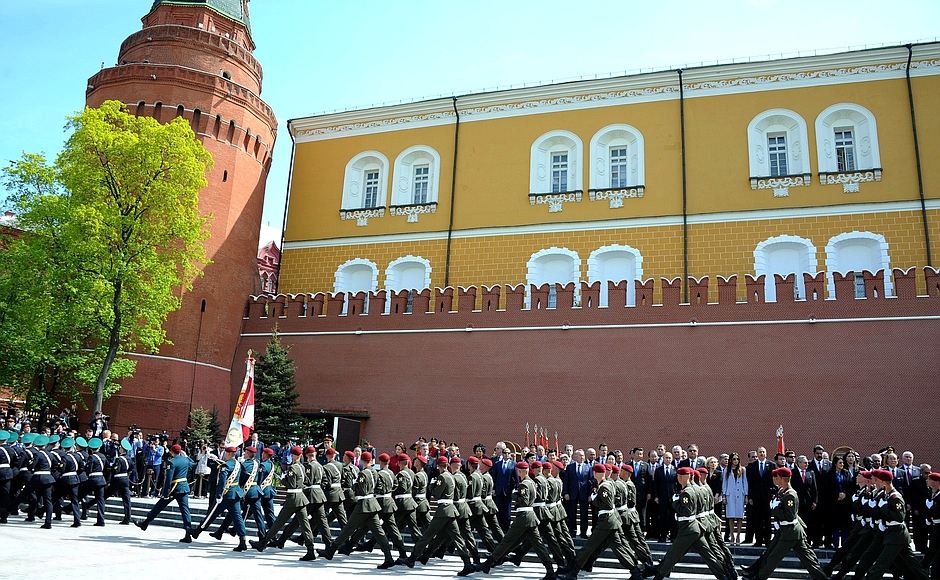
ODON soldiers marching in Alexander Garden on Victory Day in 2015.

In 1994, the OMSDON was renamed as the Independent Operational Purpose Division or ODON. The unit has been once again named after F. E. Dzerzhinsky on October 22, 2014, returning therefore to the full title of the Independent Medals of Zhukov, Lenin and October Revolution Red Banner Operational Purpose Division of the Internal Troops of the Ministry of Internal Affairs of Russia 'F. E. Dzerzhinsky' (Russian: Отдельная орденов Жукова, Ленина и Октябрьской Революции Краснознамённая дивизия оперативного назначения Внутренних войск МВД России им. Ф. Е. Дзержинского). As always, they form the first line of security during important events held in Russia, and represented the Internal Troops during the yearly Moscow Victory Parade and the Moscow November 7 Anniversary Parade (the latter because they attended that very October 1941 Revolution Day parade which was the only parade held in the midst of the Great Patriotic War).

With the formation of the National Guard of Russia, the ODON was officially, in April 2016, retitled as the Independent Orders of Zhukov, Lenin and October Revolution Red Banner Operational Purpose Division of the National Guard Forces Command of the Russian Federation named after 'F. E. Dzerzhinsky' (Russian: Отдельная орденов Жукова, Ленина и Октябрьской Революции Краснознамённая дивизия оперативного назначения Войск национальной гвардии Российской Федерации им. Ф. Е. Дзержинского).

During the 2018 FIFA World Cup, the division's units simultaneously provided public safety protection in Moscow and Kaliningrad. In accordance with decree of the President of Russia dated March 27, 2024 No. 215, the division was awarded the Order of Suvorov. The Division marked its Centennial in 2024.

== Composition ==
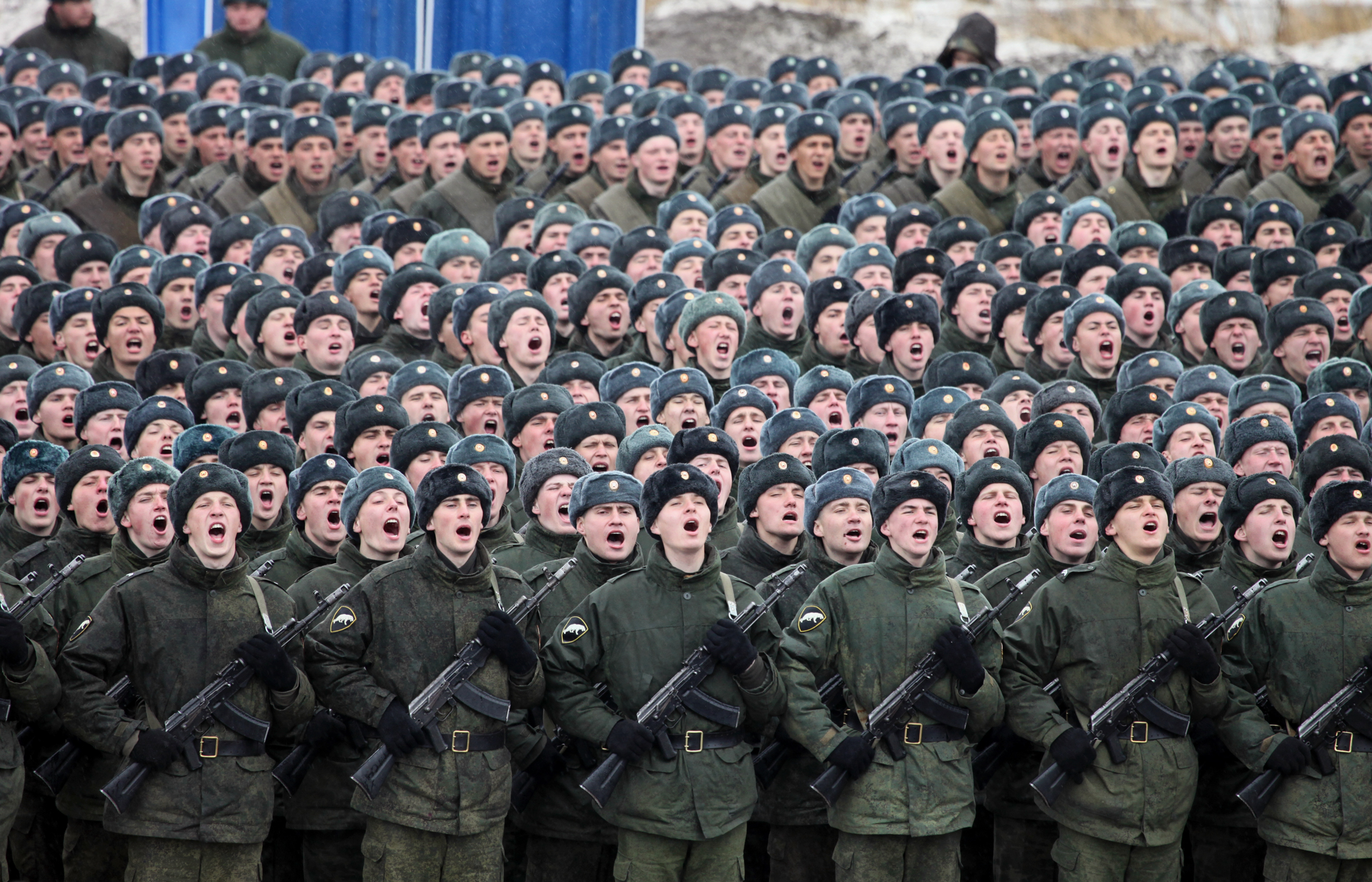
ODON division servicemen from Russian Internal Troops

The division includes the following military units (as of 1 January 2013):

- Headquarters
- 604th Special Purpose Center, Military Unit 3179 formed in 2008 combining (Vityaz and Rus)
- 2nd Operational Duties Regiment, w / h 3186
  - Honor Guard Company
- 4th Operational Duties Regiment, w / h 3419
- 5th Operational Duties Regiment, w / h 3500
- 16th Training Center, w / h 3421
- 319th Battalion for the protection and security training centers (Novaya and Noginsk, Moscow Oblast), in / hr 3058
- 344th Command Battalion, a / h 6771 (ORRiKS in / hr 3486)
- Communications Battalion, a / h 3128
- Repair and Refurbishment Battalion, w / h 3187
- Selected Medical Battalion, w / h 3532
- 4th Separate Company for radiation, chemical and biological protection, w / h 3401
- Garrison quarters and operations area, a / h 3492
- 441st Security Battalion, in / hr 6909 (formed in November–December 2012)
- 752nd Engineering Battalion, w / h 6923
- Band of the Dzerzhinsky Division

Therefore, the entire division employs more than ten thousand personnel, hundreds of armoured vehicles, and divisional artillery (mortars and anti-aircraft guns).

On the territory of the division are:

- Main Military Clinical Hospital
- Central Communication Center
- Main Center of the Automated Control System
- Center for Engineering and Technical Support
- Garrison Officers' House "Reutovo"

== Division commanders ==
- Sergei Filippov (1921–1923)
- Pavel Kobelev (1923–1928)
- Mikhail Frinovsky (1928–1930)
- Commander Sergey Kondratiev (1930–1936)
- Commander Pavel Toroshchin (1936–1938)
- Lieutenant General Pavel Artemyev (1938–1941)
- Major General Mikhail Marchenkov (1941–1943)
- Major General Andrei Golovko (1943)
- Major General Ivan Piyashev (1943–1953)
- Major General Alexander Epanchin (1953–1956)
- Major General Pavel Korzhenko (1956–1965)
- Major General Andrey Kozlov (1965–1968)
- Major General Yevgeny Pozhidaev (1969–1974)
- Major General Dmitry Nalivalkin (1974–1982)
- Major General Yuri Bogunov (1982–1987)
- Major General Vitaly Bosov (1987–1991)
- Major General Igor Rubtsov (1991–1993)
- Major General Alexander Budnikov (1993–1995)
- Major General Gennady Tikhonov (1995–1998)
- Colonel Vladimir Manyuta (1998–1999)
- Major General Nikolai Turapin (1999–2002)
- Major General Sergey Melikov (2002–2008)
- Major General Pavel Bobkov (2008–2010)
- Major General Igor Poddubny (2010–2013)
- Major General Sergey Zakharov (2013–2016)
- Major General Dmitriy Cherepanov (2016–2021)
- Major General Nikolai Kuznetsov (since 2021)

== See also ==
- Spetsnaz
- SOBR
- OMON
