= Makhachkala Rus bombing =

2005 terrorist incident in Dagestan, Russia

- Location of Dagestan in Russia
- Location: 42.9878°N 47.4731°E; Makhachkala, Dagestan, Russia
- Date: 1 July 2005
- Target: Rus (special forces)
- Attack type: Bombing
- Deaths: 11
- Injuries: 25
- Perpetrator: Sharia Jamaat

Makhachkala Rus bombing was a July 1, 2005, incident in which at least 11 members of the elite Rus unit of the Russian federal Internal Troops were killed and 25 people wounded in the bomb attack outside a public bath in Makhachkala, Dagestan.

The federal commandos of the MVD Rus unit had been sent to Dagestan only two weeks before to help the local MVD forces conduct "operation filter", which started after a 4 June 2005 rebel bomb blew up an UAZ vehicle with three policemen inside. The attack closely resembled a January 2001 bombing that killed seven Interior Ministry troops at the same site.

In few days after the bombing the chief of the city's Interior Ministry and several other local police officials were fired.
