= Rus (special forces) =

Rus' Русь
- Founded: 1 August 1994
- Disbanded: 1 September 2008
- Country: Russia
- Branch: Ministry of Internal Affairs
- Type: Special forces (spetsnaz)
- Garrison/HQ: Moscow
- Engagements: Second Chechen War; Budyonnovsk hospital hostage crisis Kizlyar-Pervomayskoye hostage crisis

Rus' (Russian: Русь) was one of the special forces (spetsnaz) units of the Ministry of Internal Affairs of the Russian Federation (MVD). Rus' belonged to the Independent Operative Purpose Division (ODON) rapid deployment division of the Internal Troops of Russia, the gendarmerie force of the MVD, and was assigned primarily to counter-terrorism duties.

Rus' was created on August 1, 1994, and traced its roots from the 4th Battalion of the Soviet OMSBON, the Independent Motorized Infantry Battalion of Special Purpose, later renamed ODON. The dedicated role of the Rus' unit was counter-terrorism and direct action in times of crisis, but actively participated in military and paramilitary operations in Chechnya and the broader North Caucasus region along with other MVD units, such as Vityaz. Rus' participated in numerous notable incidents in Russia, including in the Budyonnovsk hospital hostage crisis and the Kizlyar-Pervomayskoye hostage crisis.

On July 1, 2005, an entire platoon of Rus' commandos in Makhachkala, Dagestan, was eliminated by a roadside bombing attack while participating in the Guerrilla phase of the Second Chechen War.

On September 1, 2008, Rus' and Vityaz were formally deactivated and merged into a single unit, the 604th Special Purpose Center, under the direct command of ODON (formerly OMSDON). On 5 April 2016, the National Guard of Russia was established, resulting in the dissolution of the Interior Troops of Russia and the transfer of command of most armed forces under the MVD to the National Guard.
