= Vityaz (MVD) =

Vityaz Витязь
- 1st Special Purpose Unit of the Internal Forces "Vityaz"; 1-й Oтряд специального назначения Внутренних войск «Витязь»
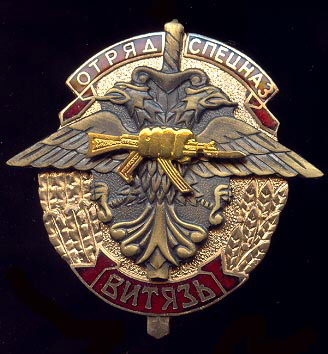
- Vityaz unit emblem, showing an AKS-74 rifle imposed on the double-headed eagle (originally a Soviet red star)
- Founded: 5 May 1991
- Disbanded: 1 September 2008
- Country: Russia
- Branch: Ministry of Internal Affairs
- Type: Special forces (spetsnaz)
- Role: Counter-terrorism
- Garrison/HQ: Moscow
- Engagements: East Prigorodny conflict 1993 Russian constitutional crisis First Chechen War

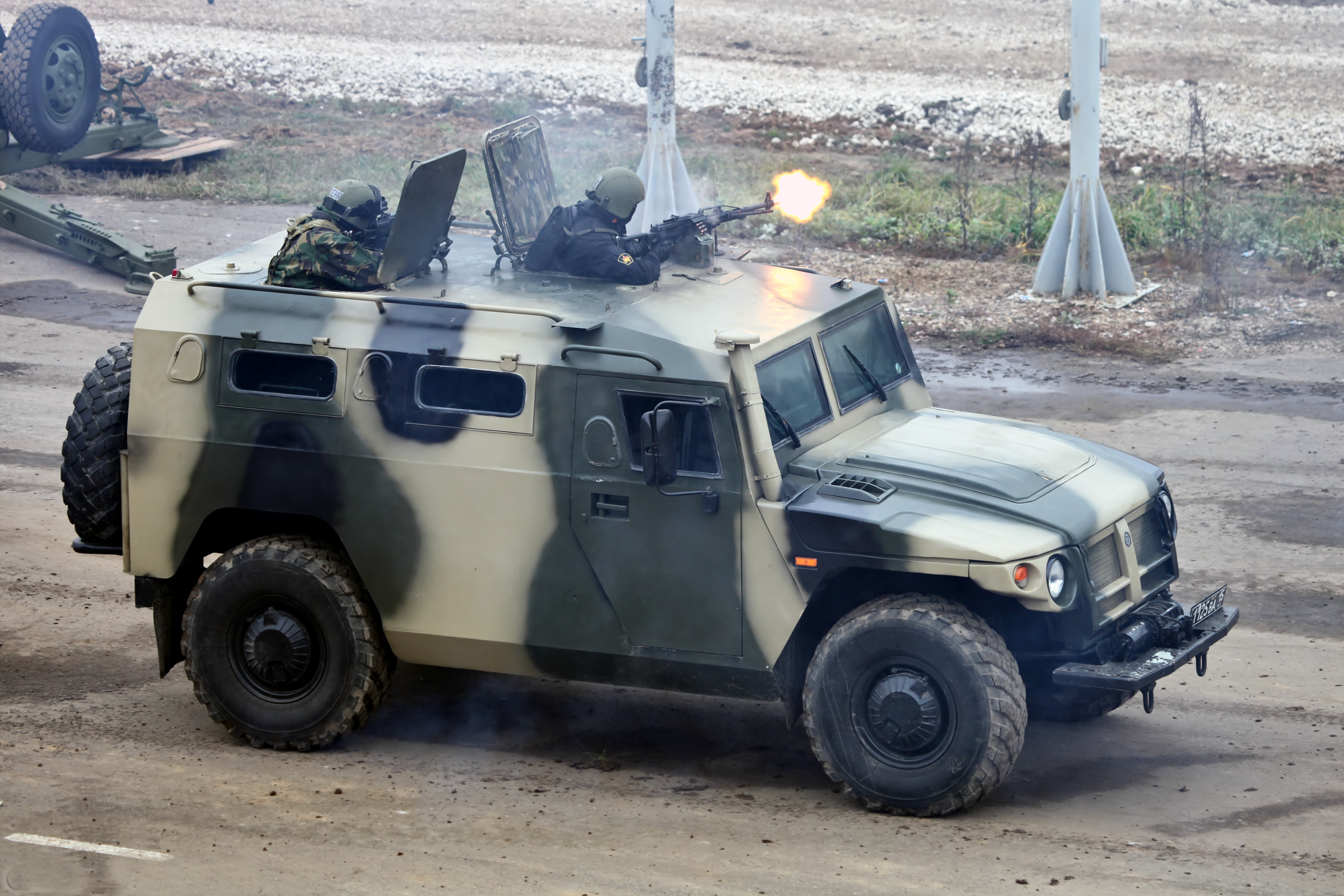
Vityaz personnel in a GAZ-2975 at the public show Interpolitex 2012

The 1st Special Purpose Unit of the Internal Forces "Vityaz" (Russian: 1-й Oтряд специального назначения Внутренних войск «Витязь»), commonly known as Vityaz (Витязь, lit. 'Knight'), was one of the special forces (spetsnaz) units of the Ministry of Internal Affairs of the Russian Federation (MVD) from 1991 to 2008. Vityaz belonged to the Independent Operative Purpose Division (ODON) rapid deployment division of the Internal Troops of Russia, the gendarmerie force of the MVD, and was assigned specifically to counter-terrorism duties, with additional roles such as countering civil unrest, prison rebellions, and mutinies of regular army units.

On 1 September 2008, Vityaz was merged with Rus into the 604th Special Operations Center, a single special forces unit of ODON, which continued to use the Vityaz name and insignia. On 5 April 2016, ODON became part of the National Guard of Russia following the dissolution of the Interior Troops and the transfer of command from the MVD. The Vityaz name and logo is also used by a private security firm in Russia.

== History ==
Vityaz was created on May 5, 1991, formed on the basis of the pre-existing 6th detachment of OSNAZ, the spetsnaz unit within the OMSDON division of Soviet Internal Troops. The OSNAZ 6th detachment unit was involved in a variety of operations and incidents in the Soviet Union through the 1980s, often in cooperation with the KGB's Alpha Group.

In November 1991, following the separatist All-National Congress of the Chechen People of the Chechen Republic of Ichkeria's seizure of government buildings in Chechnya, Vityaz was part of the Internal Troops of Russia contingent sent to restore the Kremlin's control over the capital city Grozny. Their deployment was blocked by soldiers of the Chechen National Guard immediately after landing, and Vityaz was then flown back without even disembarking following a standoff at Grozny Airport. In 1992–1993, it was sent to the East Prigorodny conflict to fight against ethnic Ingush militias.

On October 3, 1993, during the Russian constitutional crisis, Vityaz personnel in BTR armored vehicles were accused of indiscriminately gunning down a crowd of both anti-Yeltsin protesters (most of them unarmed) and onlookers at the Ostankino TV center in Moscow. The media reported at least 46 fatalities, including Rory Peck and three other journalists. The unit's commander, Colonel Sergei Lysyuk, was awarded Hero of the Russian Federation for his actions in the Perestroika era, including at Fergana, Nagorno-Karabakh, Yerevan, and Baku which were credited as "saving Yeltsin's rule from the opposition".

From 1994, Vityaz was active in the First Chechen War, including the federal assaults on Argun and Gudermes, as well as against insurgents in the greater North Caucasus. Vityaz was possibly present during the Samashki massacre in Chechnya in 1995. Vityaz also participated in the Kizlyar-Pervomayskoye hostage crisis in 1996 and in the Moscow theater hostage crisis in 2002.

On September 1, 2008, Vityaz and Rus were formally deactivated and merged into a single unit, the 604th Special Purpose Center, under the direct command of ODON (formerly OMSDON). On 5 April, 2016, the National Guard of Russia was established, resulting in the dissolution of the Interior Troops of Russia and the transfer of command of most armed forces under the MVD to the National Guard. The Vityaz name and logo is now used by a private security firm and a private security training center headed by the unit's former commander, Sergei Lysyuk.

== See also ==
- 604th Special Purpose Center
