= SOBR =

Police tactical unit

Special Rapid Response Unit
- Специальный Отряд Быстрого Реагирования (Russian)
- Patch of the SOBR
- Active: 10 February 1992; 34 years ago
- Country: Russia
- Agency: National Guard of Russia
- Type: Spetsnaz
- Abbreviation: SOBR

Structure
- Officers: c. 5,200

The Special Rapid Response Unit (Russian: СОБР — Специальный Отряд Быстрого Реагирования, Spetsialnyy Otryad Bystrogo Reagirovaniya, lit. "Special Unit of Quick Response"), formerly known from 2002 to 2011 as OMSN (Otryad Militsii Spetsial'nogo Naznacheniya, "Special Police Unit"), is a spetsnaz formation within the National Guard of Russia (Rosgvardiya). SOBR units, along with OMON forces, function as elite paramilitary police organizations equipped with military-grade gear, specialized uniforms, and advanced tactical training. Designed for rapid deployment and high-risk operations, they serve a role analogous to police tactical units in other countries and are typically mobilized at the discretion of local police command structures. Similar SOBR-designated formations also operate in other Commonwealth of Independent States, including Kazakhstan and Kyrgyzstan.

== History ==
SOBR was formed on 10 February 1992, and was subordinated to the "Directorate for combating the Organized Crime" under the Russian Interior Ministry (MVD). SOBR units were composed of senior-ranking police officers, better trained than the members of OMON (which is a cross between riot police and gendarmerie (paramilitary police)), and tasked with PTU operations under the jurisdiction of the MVD. The primary function of SOBR is to combat organized crime, with additional roles including anti-irregular military operations, counterterrorism, executive protection, high-risk law enforcement, and tactical operations in hostage rescue. They also assist in providing security to important government buildings and infrastructure in times of crisis, special operations in dangerous areas, and supporting crowd control operations. They fought during the Chechen Wars and the War in Dagestan.

Russia's first regional SOBR units were formed on 10 February 1992, under the Ministry of Internal Affairs (MVD) within the Directorate for Combating Organized Crime, on the model of the previously established Moscow unit. SOBR units were staffed by senior-ranking police officers and typically received better training than the members of OMON, the paramilitary police (special police) units of the MVD; their personnel were drawn from the OMON units. They carried out police tactical unit operations under the jurisdiction of the MVD, including the apprehension of dangerous criminals and high-profile raids. This was while also participating in anti-irregular forces, conventional warfare, counterterrorism, and high-risk law enforcement and tactical operation situations such as the Chechen Wars..

On 16 September 2002, SOBR was dissolved, and its units were reclassified as OMSN (Russian:отряды милиции специального назначения, Special Purpose Police Units), becoming subordinated to the regional criminal police offices, and since the establishment of the Investigative Committee of Russia, has co-operated with federal investigative authorities. Due to the similarity in function as OMSN, and the popularity of the SOBR name, OMSN was commonly referred to as "SOBR," and the terms were often used interchangeably despite SOBR being officially non-existent.

In 2007, in Russia, there were 87 OMSN units, counting over 5,000 officers stationed in major Russian cities. The most famous unit of the formation is OMSN "Rys" (lynx, Cyrillic ОМСН "Рысь"), established in 1992, which, since its inception has participated in almost all known special operations in Russia.

In 2011, OMSN units were renamed OSN (отряды специального назначения, Special Purpose Unit), but in 2012, the SOBR name returned into existence during reforms of the MVD, as all special forces units under the ministry's command were renamed from OMSN to SOBR.

SOBR "Terek" placed 1st in the 2015 Annual Warrior Competition held annually in Jordan. Other teams participating were a U.S. Marine Corps Special Operations Battalion and China's Assault Hawk Commando Unit of the People's Armed Police (PAP), which placed second overall. Overall, 37 teams from 18 different nations participated in the event.

On 5 April 2016, following the establishment of the National Guard of Russia, the Internal Troops of Russia were disestablished, and the command of their units, including SOBR, was transferred from the MVD to the National Guard. According to a statement by General Zolotov, troops from OMON and SOBR received the status of military personnel in 2018.^{p. 20}

SOBR units participated in the 2022 Russian invasion of Ukraine, where they were intended to disperse riots after Kyiv and other major Ukrainian cities were captured. The failure to capture Kyiv resulted in some SOBR missions becoming redundant, and some of its personnel being killed in action or captured by the Ukrainian Armed Forces. At the Battle of Irpin, due to overly optimistic operational plans and the lack of communications with other units, an unarmored and under-equipped SOBR unit from the Kemerovo Oblast ended up separated from the main Army forces. They ended up accidentally spearheading the assault on the city, getting ambushed at a bridge over the Irpin River. Reportedly, of the 80 SOBR and OMON officers in the convoy, only 3 survived.

== Mission ==
SOBR units are focused on the fight against criminal gangs in urban environments, high-risk law enforcement and tactical operation situations, urban public security actions, and in circumstances where the rules of engagement are strict. SOBR units are also deployed in counter-terrorism operations, in order to provide a heavy cordon. Large-scale counterterrorism operations usually involve OMON, Spetsnaz FSB, and Spetsnaz GRU units due to the large personnel demands.

== Notable SOBR teams ==
Every SOBR unit has an individual character. According to National Interest, the level of equipment of SOBR teams depends on the level of wealth of the relevant region.

- Bryansk Oblast: SOBR "Partizan"
- Kaliningrad Oblast: SOBR “Viking”
- Novgorod Oblast: SOBR “Rubin” ("Ruby" or "sardius")
- Moscow Oblast: SOBR “Bulat” ("Damascus steel" or "sword made of Damascus steel")
- Smolensk Oblast: SOBR "Sigma"
- Chechnya: SOBR “Akhmat” (previously known as “Terek” from 2009 to 2021)
- Crimea: SOBR "Khalzan" ("Golden eagle")

== See also ==
- Rus (special forces)
- Vityaz (MVD)
- Spetsnaz
