= Spetsnaz =

Russian term for special operations forces

Spetsnaz (Note: The term is borrowed from Russian: спецназ, IPA: [spʲɪtsˈnas]; abbreviation for Russian: Войска́ специа́льного назначе́ния, romanized: Voyska spetsialnogo naznachéniya, IPA: [vɐjˈska spʲɪt͡sɨˈalʲnəvə nəznɐˈt͡ɕenʲɪjə], lit. 'Special Operations Forces' or 'Special Purpose Military Units'; Ukrainian: сили спеціальних операцій, romanized: syly spetsialnykh operatsii, lit. 'special operations forces' or спецпризначенці, spetspryznachentsi, 'specially designated (plural noun)') are special operations forces in the former Soviet Union and Russia. Historically, this term referred to the Soviet Union's Spetsnaz GRU, special operations units of the Main Intelligence Directorate of the Soviet General Staff (GRU). Today it refers to special forces branches and task forces subordinate to ministries including defence, internal affairs, or emergency situations in countries that have inherited their special purpose units from the now-defunct Soviet security agencies.

== Etymology ==
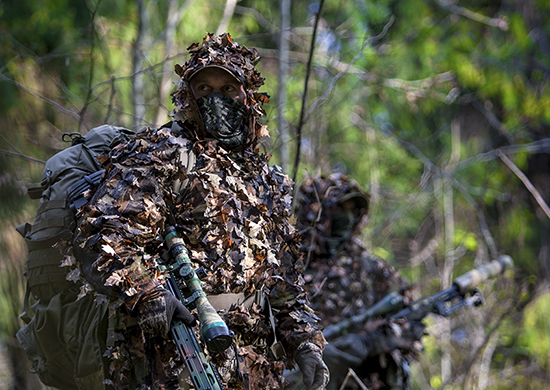
Russian Spetsnaz SSO snipers

The Russian abbreviations spetsnaz and osnaz are syllabic abbreviations of Soviet era Russian, for spetsialnogo naznacheniya and osobogo naznacheniya, both of which may be interpreted as "special purpose". As syllabic acronyms they are not normally capitalized.

In Ukrainian they are known as spetspryz (спецприз), an abbreviation of viiska spetsiialnoho pryznachennia (війська спеціяльного призначення).

They are general terms that were used for a variety of Soviet special operations (spetsoperatsiya) units. In addition, many Cheka and Internal Troops units (such as OMSDON and ODON) also included osobovo naznacheniya in their full names. Regular forces assigned to special tasks were sometimes also referred to by terms such as Spetsnaz and osnaz.

Spetsnaz later referred specifically to special (spetsialnogo) purpose (naznacheniya) or special operations (spetsoperatsiya; spec ops) forces, and the word's widespread use is a relatively recent, post-perestroika development in Russian language. The Soviet public used to know very little about their country's special forces until many state secrets were disclosed under the glasnost ("openness") policy of Mikhail Gorbachev during the late 1980s. Since then, stories about spetsnaz and their purportedly incredible prowess, from the serious to the highly questionable, have captivated the imagination of Russians. A number of books about the Soviet military special forces, such as 1987's Spetsnaz: The Story Behind the Soviet SAS by defected GRU agent Viktor Suvorov, helped introduce the term to the Western public.

== History and known operations ==
The Imperial Russian Army had hunter-commando units, formed by a decree of Emperor Alexander III in 1886, which saw action in World War I prior to the Russian Revolution of 1917. Also, during World War I, General Aleksei Brusilov became one of the first senior commanders to use the tactics of fast action shock troops for assaults following concentrated accurate artillery fire in what would later be known as the Brusilov Offensive of 1916. Such tactics, considered revolutionary at the time, would later inspire people like Prussian Captain Willy Rohr in the development of the Prussian Stormtroopers (founded in 1915).

=== Early Soviet Union ===
The origins of the Spetsnaz can be found in the Russian Civil War. To act against anti-Communist workers and farmers, the Soviet regime set up so called Tschasti Osobogo Nasatschenia (Units for special use) in 1918. In the next year they were expanded to the so-called Cheka (The All-Russian Extraordinary Commission), fighting counterrevolution and (alleged) sabotage. They took part in the Kronstadt rebellion 1921, setting up machine guns behind units of the Red Army, to "increase their motivation". The GRU and NKVD descended from the Cheka. Since 1927 Russians were experimenting with parachutes. Airborne units were used against central Asian and Afghan insurgents.

=== Second World War and Spanish Civil War ===
GRU and NKVD derived from the Cheka and participated in the Spanish Civil War fighting fascists behind their lines using guerilla strategies. Fighting Germany, Japan, Poland and Finland in the Second World War, new units of storm pioneers, parachuters, NKVD and GRU were set up. Thereby the soviets merged existing experiences and started to unify different military branches.

==== Navy ====
The Soviet leadership had an urgent need for intelligence on German land forces in northern Norway and Finland. On 5 July 1941 Admiral Arseniy Golovko of the Northern Fleet authorized the formation of a ground reconnaissance detachment. This unit, the 4th Special Volunteer Detachment, was to be recruited from the fleet's athletes and have an initial size of 65 to 70 personnel. Later the unit was renamed the 181st Special Reconnaissance Detachment. They were trained as frogmen. The most prominent of these new recruits was Viktor Leonov, who joined the Soviet Navy in 1937. He was assigned to a submarine training detachment and then transferred to a repair station in the Northern Fleet at Polyarnyy. Leonov had trained as a scuba diver, after which he joined 4th Special Volunteer Detachment, where he proved his daring and leadership skills conducting numerous clandestine operations and twice being awarded the title of Hero of the Soviet Union.

Initially the unit was confined to performing small scale reconnaissance missions, platoon sized insertions by sea and on occasion on land into Finland and later Norway. They began conducting sabotage missions and raids to snatch prisoners for interrogation. They would also destroy German ammunition and supply depots, communication centers, and harass enemy troop concentrations along the Finnish and Russian coasts. When the European conflict ended, the Naval Scouts were sent to fight the Japanese. Leonov along with Capt. Kulebyakin and 140 men, landed on a Japanese airfield at Port Vonsan, unaware that they were opposed by over 3,500 enemy soldiers. A tense standoff ensued, until the commanding officers of the unit managed to bluff the Japanese forces into surrendering.

==== Army ====
Each Soviet front/army up to 1942 had their own independent guard-battalion (Otdelnly Gwardieskij Batalion Minerow), OGBM, so called miners, for reconnaissance and commando missions. The soldiers had to be younger than 30, were mostly athletes or hunters and had to identify 100% with their mission. Many exhausted and wounded soldiers were, even in training, left to their own devices. The selection methods qualified the troops as elite but caused high numbers of casualties. The "miners" infiltrated foreign-occupied areas by air and land, and cooperated with, and trained, local partisans.

Immediately before the major Russian offensive at Smolesk in 1943, 316 OGBM were dropped by parachute in nine groups. Up to 300 km behind the enemy lines, they blew up 700 km of railways in cooperation with local partisans, using 3,500 explosive charges.

=== Cold War ===
By the end of the Second World War the Soviet Union dissolved most of the special units. At the end of the 1950s the KGB and GRU set new special forces units up. The 3rd guard special-reconnaissance-brigade was founded in 1966, being stationed with the Soviet forces in East Germany in Fürstenberg/Havel.

==== The Crabb Affair ====
Lieutenant-Commander Lionel Crabb was a British Royal Navy frogman and MI6 diver who vanished during a reconnaissance mission around a Soviet cruiser berthed at Portsmouth Dockyard in 1956. In November 2007 the BBC and the Daily Mirror reported that Eduard Koltsov, a former Soviet frogman, claimed to have caught Crabb placing a mine on the Ordzhonikidze hull near the ammunition depot and cut his throat. In an interview for a Russian documentary film, Koltsov showed the dagger he allegedly used, as well as an Order of the Red Star medal that Koltsov claimed to have been awarded for the deed. Koltsov, 74 at the time of the interview, stated that he wanted to clear his conscience and uncover what exactly had happened to Crabb. Peter Mercer of the Special Boat Service describes this incident in his autobiography: "The cruiser [Ordzhonikidze] was carrying the two Soviet leaders, Khrushchev and Bulganin, on a goodwill visit to Britain. His [Crabb's] task was to measure the cruiser's propeller and to discover how the ship managed to travel at twice the speed originally estimated by British naval intelligence."

==== Prague Spring ====
The Warsaw pact invaded Czechoslovakia in 1968 to stop the "Socialism with a Human Face" movement. Spetsnaz units secured key points in the capital, Prague, seizing the airport, bridges, radio stations and the president's palace.

==== Spetsnaz in Vietnam and Laos ====
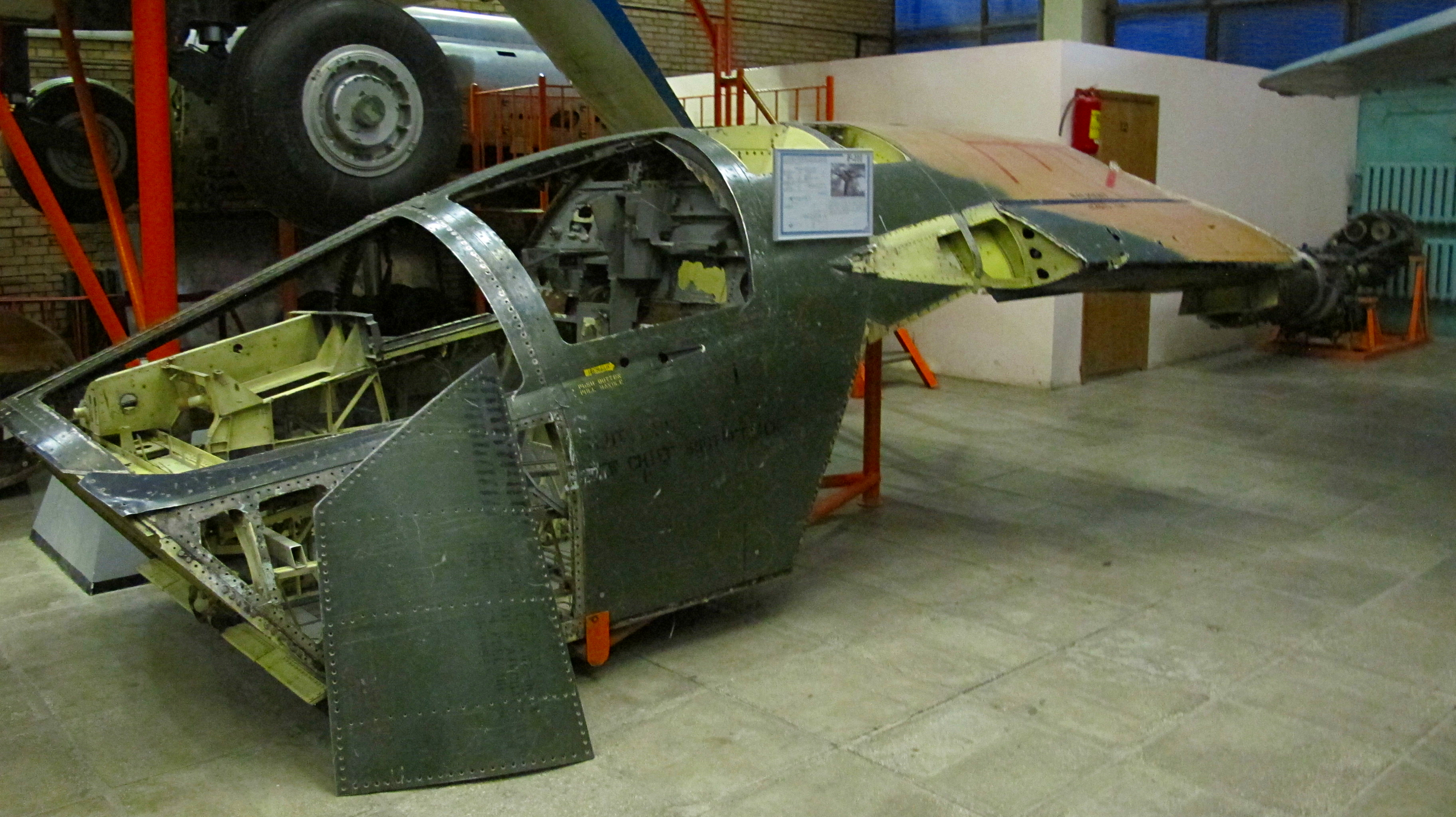
F-111 escape capsule at Museum of Moscow Aviation Institute

Some 3,300 Soviet military experts, among them spetsnaz, were sent to Southeast Asia during the Vietnam War. Within South Vietnam, rumors persisted for years that men with blue eyes were reportedly spotted doing recon missions and testing their new SVD Dragunov sniper rifles. John Stryker Meyer was with Studies and Observation Group RT Idaho and had two encounters with what they believed were spetsnaz units operating in Laos in 1968.

Their mission was twofold: first of all, to help a communist nation defeat an American ally, and secondly, test and evaluate their most sophisticated radars and missiles directly against the best aircraft America could deploy. Soviets recovered at least two very important pieces of American equipment, a cryptographic code machine, and an F-111A escape capsule, which now sits in a Moscow Museum.

==== Soviet–Afghan War ====
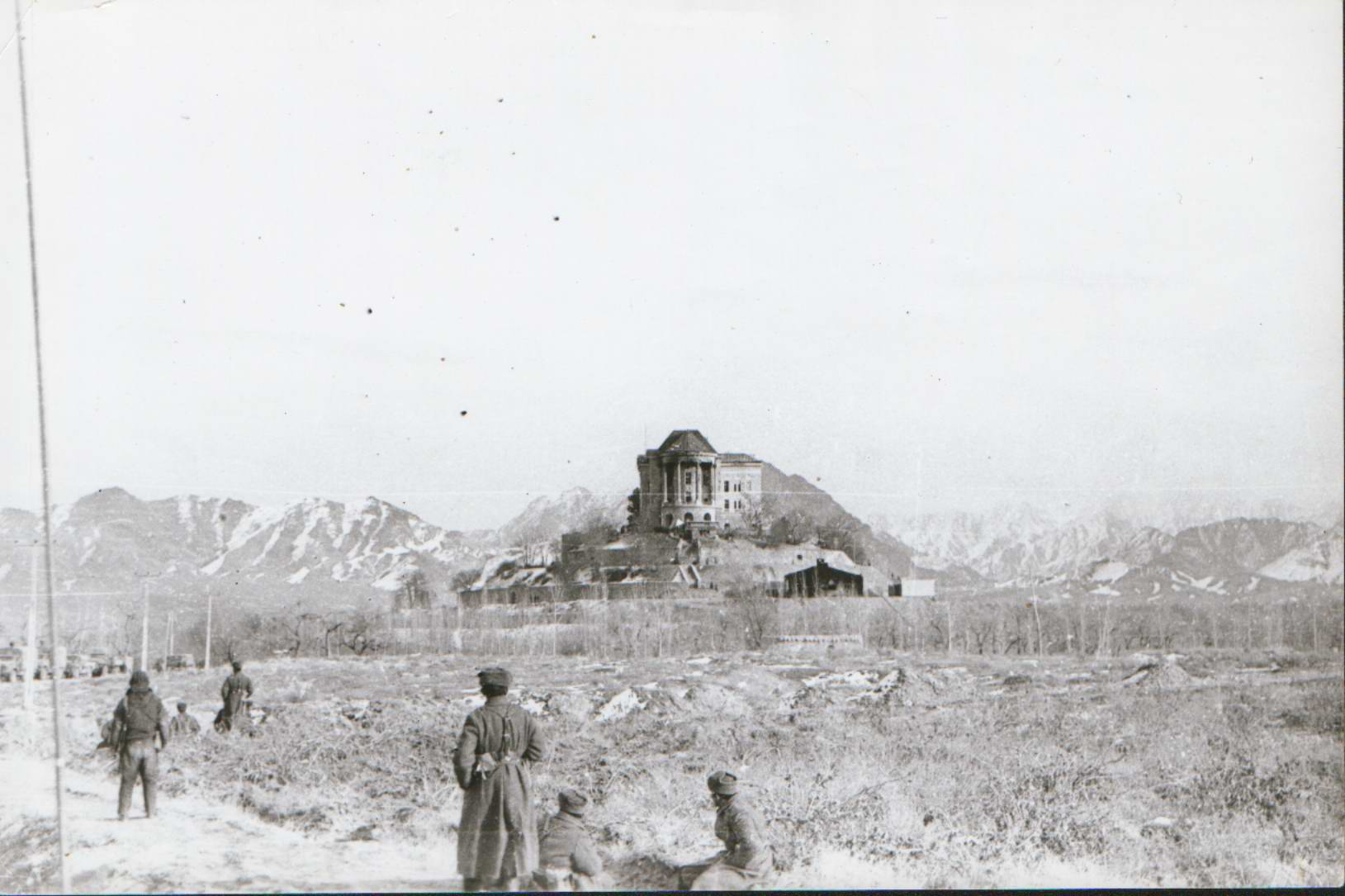
Soviet special forces surround Tajbeg Palace following the operation.

Soviet Spetsnaz forces took part in the Soviet–Afghan War of 1979–1989 in Afghanistan, usually fighting fast insertion/extraction-type warfare with helicopters. Their most famous operation, Operation Storm-333, was executed on 27 December 1979 which saw Soviet special forces storming the Tajbeg Palace in Afghanistan and killing Afghan President Hafizullah Amin, his son and over 300 of his personal guards in 40 minutes. The Soviets then installed Babrak Karmal as Amin's successor.

The operation involved approximately 660 Soviet operators dressed in Afghan uniforms, including ca. 50 KGB and GRU officers from the Alpha Group and Zenith Group. The Soviet forces occupied major governmental, military and media buildings in Kabul, including their primary target – the Tajbeg Palace.

In the first one and a half years of the war, Spetsnaz units in the form of the 459th special forces company, were exclusively responsible for reconnaissance missions and intelligence gathering for the 40th Army. Aside from reconnaissance, the 459th was also tasked with capturing prisoners, kidnapping enemy agents, and targeted assassination of leaders and field commanders of the Mujahideen.

===== Caravan war =====
By 1985, the GRU had expanded its special forces footprint to two Spetsnaz brigades in Afghanistan, comprising just under 5,000 troops. These were the:

15th Special Purpose Brigade – paired up and supported by 239th Helicopter Squadron equipped with Mi-24 (16 units), Mi-8 (16 units), deployment in Ghazni.

- 154th Oospn
- 177th Oospn
- 334th Oospn
- 668th Oospn

22nd Special Purpose Brigade – paired up and supported by 205th Helicopter Squadron equipped with Mi-24 (16 units) Mi-8 (16 units) deployed in Lashkar Gah.

- 173rd Oospn
- 186th Oospn
- 370th Oospn
- 411th Oospn

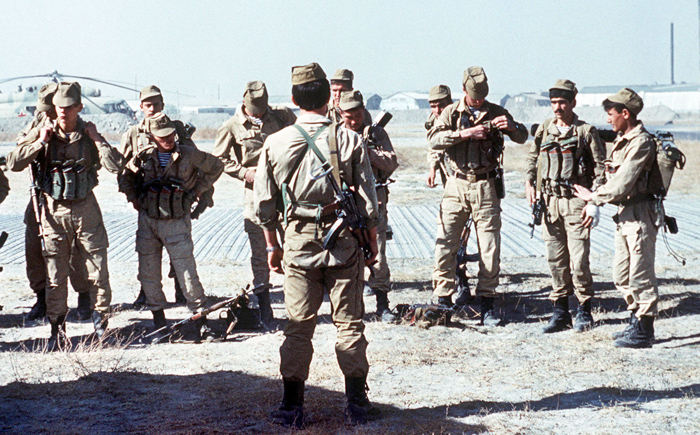
A Soviet Spetsnaz group prepare for a mission in Afghanistan.

The Spetsnaz often conducted missions to ambush and destroy enemy supply convoys. The Mujahideen had great respect for the Spetsnaz, seeing them as a much more difficult opponent than the typical Soviet conscript soldier. They said that the Spetsnaz-led air assault operations had changed the complexion of the war. They also credited the Spetsnaz with closing down all the supply routes along the Afghan-Pakistani border in 1986. In April 1986, the rebels lost one of their biggest bases, at Zhawar in Paktia Province, to a Soviet spetsnaz air-assault. The Spetsnaz achieved victory by knocking out several rebel positions above the base, a mile-long series of fortified caves in a remote canyon. A successful long-term campaign codenamed Operation "Curtain" or "Veil", lasted from 1984 to 1988, which aimed to close off the Afghan-Pakistani border and cut off supply routes coming in from Pakistan. The operation caused great distress to the mujahedin war effort, with Spetsnaz units intercepting 990 supply caravans and killing 17,000 insurgents. For their role in Operation Curtain, the Spetsnaz suffered a total of 570 killed with a further 11 missing. Casualty breakdown by unit was:

- 15th Spetsnaz Brigade – 355 killed and 10 missing.
- 22nd Spetsnaz Brigade – 199 killed and one missing.
- 459th Spetsnaz Company – 16 killed.

In May 1986, the Spetsnaz also succeeded in inserting air-assault forces into remote regions in Konar Valley near Barikot which were previously considered inaccessible to Soviet forces.

===== Alleged conflict with Pakistani commandos =====
It is believed that during the war in Afghanistan, Soviet special forces came in direct conflict with Pakistan Army's special forces, the Special Service Group. This unit was deployed disguised as Afghans, supporting the Mujahideen fighting the Soviets. A battle reported as having been fought between the Pakistanis and Soviet troops took place in Kunar Province in March 1986. According to Soviet sources, the battle was actually fought between the GRU's 15th Spetsnaz Brigade, and the Usama Bin Zaid regiment of Afghan Mujahideen under Commander Assadullah, belonging to Abdul rub a-Rasul Sayyaf's faction. Fighting is also alleged to have taken place during Operation Magistral where over 200 Mujahideen were killed in a failed attempt to capture the strategic Hill 3234 near the Pakistani border from a 39-man Soviet Airborne company.

==== The Beirut hostage crisis ====
In October 1985, specialist operators from the KGB's Group "A" (Alpha) were dispatched to Beirut, Lebanon. The Kremlin had been informed of the kidnapping of four Soviet diplomats by the militant group, the Islamic Liberation Organization (a radical offshoot of the Muslim Brotherhood). It was believed that this was retaliation for the Soviet support of Syrian involvement in the Lebanese Civil War. However, by the time the Alpha group arrived, one of the hostages had already been killed. In a tit-for-tat response, Alpha group operators first identified the terrorists using local sources, then moved into the Lebanese villages where the terrorists were from and took their relatives as hostages. Some of the hostages were dismembered, and their body parts sent to the hostage takers, with the threat that their relatives were next. The remaining hostages were released immediately.

Russian sources indicate that the release of the Soviet hostages was the result of extensive diplomatic negotiations with the spiritual leader of Hezbollah, Grand Ayatollah Mohammad Hussein Fadlallah, who appealed to King Hussein of Jordan and the leaders of Libya and Iran to use their influence on the kidnappers.

Either way, the show of brutal force had its effect, and for the next 20 years no Soviet or Russian officials were taken captive, until June 2006.

=== After the breakup of Soviet Union ===
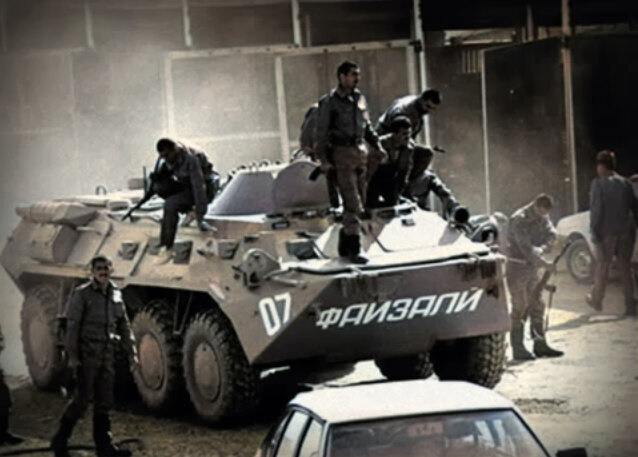
Russian Spetsnaz troops dismount from an APC during the Tajikistani Civil War.

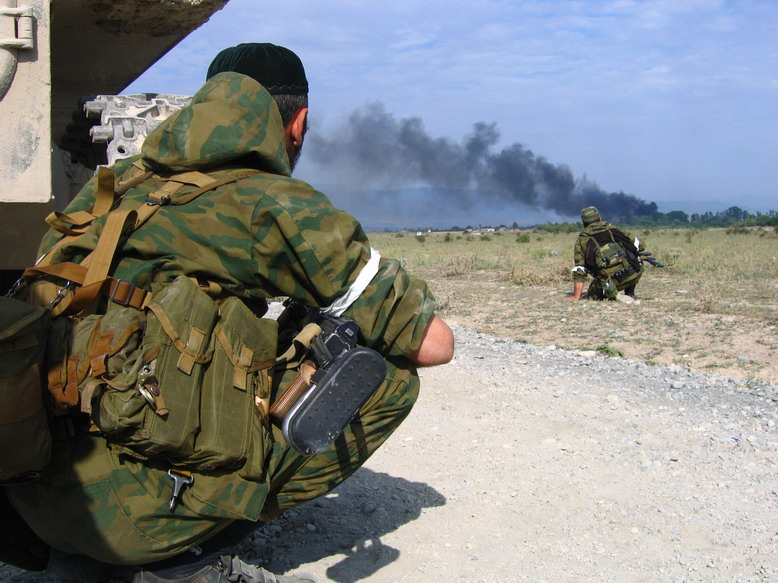
Ethnic Chechen soldiers of Sulim Yamadayev's Special Battalion Vostok during the 2008 Russo-Georgian War.

After the collapse of the USSR, spetsnaz forces of the Soviet Union's newly formed republics took part in many local conflicts such as the Tajikistani Civil War, Chechen Wars, Russo-Georgian War and the Russo-Ukrainian War. Spetsnaz forces also have been called upon to resolve several high-profile hostage situations such as the Moscow theatre hostage crisis and the Beslan school hostage crisis.

==== Budyonnovsk hospital hostage crisis ====
The crisis took place from 14 to 19 June 1995, when a group of 80 to 200 Chechen terrorists led by Shamil Basayev attacked the southern Russian city of Budyonnovsk, where they stormed the main police station and the city hall. After several hours of fighting and Russian reinforcements imminent, the Chechens retreated to the residential district and regrouped in the city hospital, where they took between 1,500 and 1,800 hostages, most of them civilians (including about 150 children and a number of women with newborn infants).

After three days of siege, the Russian authorities ordered the security forces to retake the hospital compound. The forces deployed were elite personnel from the Federal Security Service's Alpha Group, alongside MVD militsiya and Internal Troops. The strike force attacked the hospital compound at dawn on the fourth day, meeting fierce resistance. After several hours of fighting in which many hostages were killed by crossfire, a local ceasefire was agreed, and 227 hostages were released; 61 others were freed by the Russian forces.

A second Russian attack on the hospital a few hours later also failed and so did a third, resulting in even more casualties. The Russian authorities accused the Chechens of using the hostages as human shields.

According to official figures, 129 civilians were killed and 415 were injured in the entire event (of whom 18 later died of their wounds). This includes at least 105 hostage fatalities. However, according to an independent estimate 166 hostages were killed and 541 injured in the special forces attack on the hospital. At least 11 Russian police officers and 14 soldiers were killed. Basayev's force suffered 11 men killed and one missing; most of their bodies were returned to Chechnya in a special freezer truck. In the years following the hostage-taking, more than 40 of the surviving attackers were tracked down and have been assassinated, including Aslambek Abdulkhadzhiev in 2002 and Shamil Basayev in 2006, and more than 20 were sentenced, by the Stavropol territorial court, to various terms of imprisonment.

==== Kizlyar-Pervomayskoye hostage crisis ====
The mass sieges which saw people taken in the thousands also involved FSB's Alpha Group and the Spetsnaz GRU in attempted rescuing of the hostages.

==== Second Chechen War ====
Russian special forces were instrumental in Russia's and the Kremlin backed government's success in the Second Chechen War after learning lessons from the mishandling of the first war. Under joint command of Unified Group of Troops (OGV) formed on 23 September 1999. GRU, FSB and MVD spetsnaz operators conducted a myriad of counter-insurgency and counter-terrorism operations, including targeted killings of separatist leadership, in the meantime inflicting heavy casualties among Islamist separatists. Some of these successful missions were directed against separatist leaders such as Aslan Maskhadov, Abdul Halim Sadulayev, Dokka Umarov, Akhmadov brothers, Turpal-Ali Atgeriyev, Akhmed Avtorkhanov, Ibn al-Khattab, Abu al-Walid, Abu Hafs al-Urduni, Muhannad, Ali Taziev, Supyan Abdullayev, Shamil Basayev, Ruslan Gelayev, Salman Raduyev, Sulim Yamadayev, Rappani Khalilov, Yassir al-Sudani. During these missions, many operators received honors for their courage and prowess in combat, including with the title Hero of the Russian Federation. At least 106 FSB and GRU operators died during the conflict.

==== Moscow theatre hostage crisis ====
The crisis was the seizure of the crowded Dubrovka Theatre on 23 October 2002 by 40 to 50 armed Chechens who claimed allegiance to the Islamist militant separatist movement in Chechnya. They took 850 hostages and demanded the withdrawal of Russian forces from Chechnya and an end to the Second Chechen War. The siege was officially led by Movsar Barayev.

Due to the disposition of the theatre, special forces would have had to fight through 100 feet (30 m) of corridor and attack up a well defended staircase, before they could reach the hall in where the hostages were held. The terrorists also had explosive devices. The most powerful of these was in the center of the auditorium; if detonated, it could have brought down the ceiling and caused casualties in excess of 80% of the auditorium's occupants. After a two-and-a-half-day siege and the execution of two hostages, spetsnaz operators from the Federal Security Service (FSB) Alpha and Vympel a.k.a. Vega Groups, supported by the Russian Ministry of Internal Affairs (MVD) SOBR unit, pumped an undisclosed chemical agent into the building's ventilation system and raided it.

During the raid, all of the attackers were killed, with no casualties among spetsnaz, but about 130 hostages, including nine foreigners, died due to poor first aid after falling unconscious from the gas. Most died after being evacuated from the theatre and laid outside on their backs instead of in the approved recovery position and then choking to death. Russian security agencies refused to disclose the gas used in the attack leading to doctors in local hospitals being unable to respond adequately to the influx of casualties. All but two of the hostages who died during the siege were killed by the toxic substance pumped into the theatre to subdue the militants. The use of the gas was widely condemned as heavy-handed.

Physicians in Moscow condemned the refusal to disclose the identity of the gas that prevented them from saving more lives. Some reports said the drug naloxone was used to save some hostages.

==== Beslan school siege ====
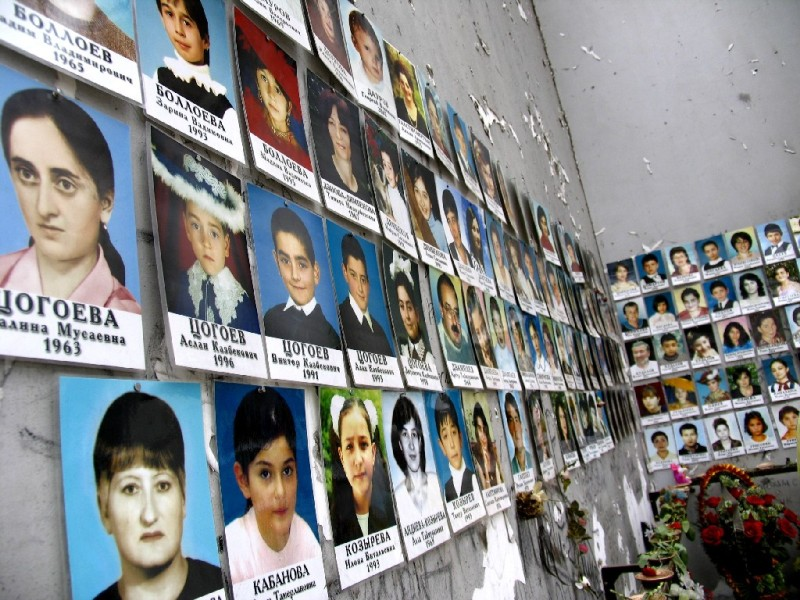
Beslan school victim photos

Also referred to as the Beslan massacre started on 1 September 2004, lasted three days and involved the capture of over 1,100 people as hostages (including 777 children), ending with the death of 334 people. The event led to security and political repercussions in Russia; in the aftermath of the crisis, there has been an increase in Ingush–Ossetian ethnic hostility, while contributing to a series of federal government reforms consolidating power in the Kremlin and strengthening of the powers of the President of Russia.

The crisis began when a group of armed radical Islamist combatants, mostly Ingush and Chechen, occupied School Number One (SNO) in the town of Beslan, North Ossetia (an autonomous republic in the North Caucasus region of the Russian Federation) on 1 September 2004. The hostage-takers were the Riyadus-Salikhin Battalion, sent by the Chechen terrorist warlord Shamil Basayev, who demanded recognition of the independence of Chechnya at the United Nations and the withdrawal of Russian forces from Chechnya.

On the third day of the standoff, counter terrorism units stormed the building using heavy weapons after several explosions rocked the building and children started escaping. It was in this chaos most of the officers were killed, trying to protect escaping children from gun fire. At least 334 hostages were killed as a result of the crisis, including 186 children. Official reports on how many members of Russia's special forces died in the fighting varied from 11, 12, 16 (7 Alpha and 9 Vega) to more than 20 killed. There are only 10 names on the special forces monument in Beslan. The fatalities included all three commanders of the assault group: Colonel Oleg Ilyin, Lieutenant Colonel Dmitry Razumovsky of Vega, and Major Alexander Perov of Alpha. At least 30 commandos suffered serious wounds.

== 2000s–present ==
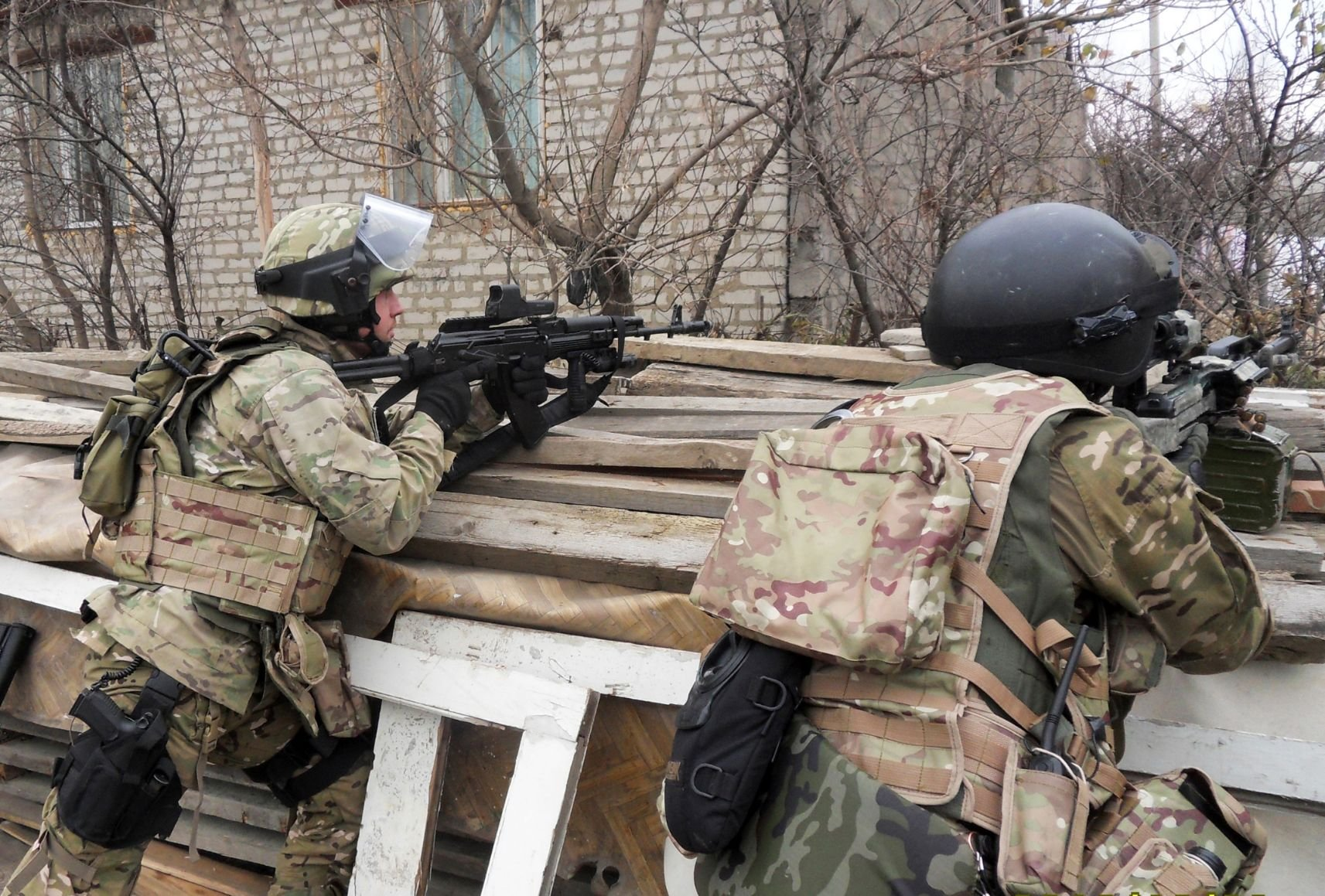
Russian FSB Spetsnaz are particularly active. Conducting 119 targeted operations in the North Caucasus in 2006 alone, during which they killed more than 100 members of terrorist groups.

By the mid-2000s, the special forces gained a firm upper hand over separatists and terrorist attacks in Russia dwindled, falling from 257 in 2005 to 48 in 2007. Military analyst Vitaly Shlykov praised the effectiveness of Russia's security agencies, saying that the experience learned in Chechnya and Dagestan had been key to the success. In 2008, the American Carnegie Endowment's Foreign Policy magazine named Russia as "the worst place to be a terrorist", particularly highlighting Russia's willingness to prioritize national security over civil rights. By 2010, Russian special forces, led by the FSB, had managed to eliminate the top leadership of the Chechen insurgency, except for Dokka Umarov.

From 2009, the level of terrorism in Russia increased again. Particularly worrisome was the increase in suicide attacks. While between February 2005 and August 2008, no civilians were killed in such attacks, in 2008 at least 17 were killed and in 2009 the number rose to 45. In March 2010, Islamist militants organised the 2010 Moscow Metro bombings, which killed 40 people. One of the two blasts took place at Lubyanka station, near the FSB headquarters. Militant leader Doku Umarov—dubbed "Russia's Osama bin Laden"—took responsibility for the attacks. In July 2010, President Dmitry Medvedev expanded the FSB's powers in its fight against terrorism.

In 2011, Federal Security Service exposed 199 foreign spies, including 41 professional spies and 158 agents employed by foreign intelligence services. The number has risen in recent years: in 2006 the FSB reportedly caught about 27 foreign intelligence officers and 89 foreign agents. Comparing the number of exposed spies historically, the then-FSB Director Nikolay Kovalyov said in 1996: "There has never been such a number of spies arrested by us since the time when German agents were sent in during the years of World War II." The 2011 figure is similar to what was reported in 1995–1996, when around 400 foreign intelligence agents were uncovered during the two-year period.

=== Anti terrorist operations prior to 2014 Sochi Olympics ===
Olympic organizers received several threats prior to the Games. In a July 2013 video release, Chechen Islamist commander Dokka Umarov called for attacks on the Games, stating that the Games were being staged "on the bones of many, many Muslims killed ...and buried on our lands extending to the Black Sea." Threats were received from the group Vilayat Dagestan, which had claimed responsibility for the Volgograd bombings under the demands of Umarov, and a number of National Olympic Committees had also received threats via e-mail, threatening that terrorists would kidnap or "blow up" athletes during the Games.

In response to the insurgent threats, Russian special forces cracked down on suspected terrorist organizations, making several arrests and claiming to have curbed several plots, and killed numerous Islamist leaders including Eldar Magatov, a suspect in attacks on Russian targets and alleged leader of an insurgent group in the Babyurt district of Dagestan. Dokka Umarov himself was poisoned on 6 August 2013, and died on 7 September 2013.

=== Insurgency in the Caucasus ===
Although crime has been markedly reduced and stability increased throughout Russia compared to the previous year, about 350 militants in the North Caucasus have been killed in anti-terror operations in the first four months of 2014, according to an announcement by Interior Minister Vladimir Kolokoltsev in the State Duma.

On 23 September 2014, Russian news agencies marked the 15th anniversary of the formation of the Unified Group of Troops (OGV, or ОГВ) in the North Caucasus. The OGV is the inter-service headquarters established at Khankala, Chechnya to command all Russian (MOD, MVD, FSB) operations from the start of the second Chechen war in 1999.

Since its inception, the OGV combined operations has conducted 40,000 special missions, destroyed 5,000 bases and caches, confiscated 30,000 weapons, and disarmed 80,000 explosive devices and in the process has killed over 10,000 insurgents in the time frame of 15 years. The Ministry of Internal Affairs (MVD) noted that the decoration Hero of the Russian Federation has been awarded to 93 MVD servicemen in the OGV (including 66 posthumously). Overall, more than 23,000 MVD troops have received honors for their conduct during operations.

Russian spetsnaz forces participated in the 2014 Grozny clashes.

=== Russo-Ukrainian War ===
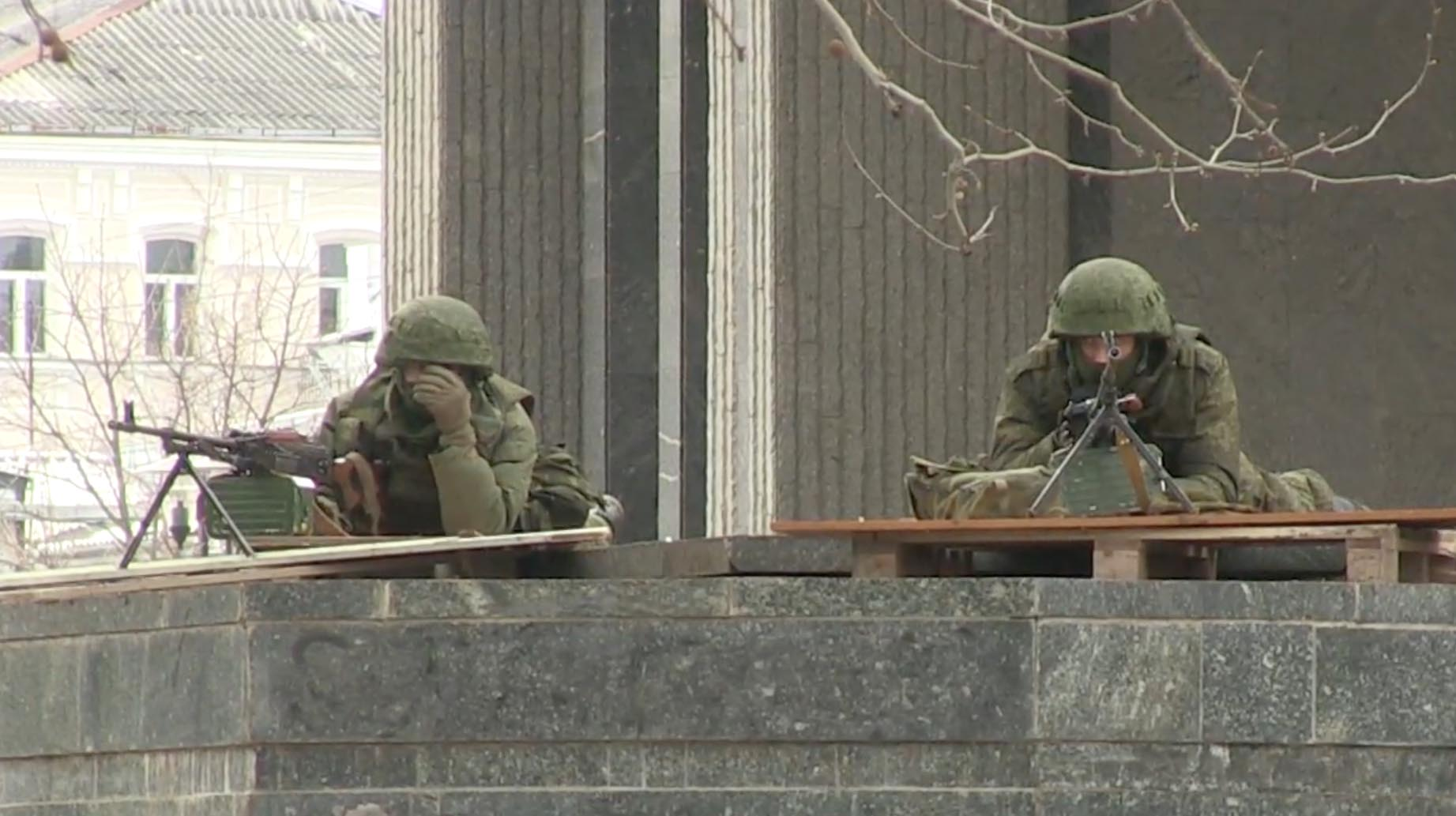
Russian troops without insignia at the building of the Verkhovna Rada of the Autonomous Republic of Crimea during its capture.

According to multiple Western sources and Ukraine, Spetsnaz unit of the VDV RF took part in the annexation of Crimea by the Russian Federation. Several hundred members of the 45th Detached Guards Spetsnaz Regiment and the 22nd Spetsnaz brigade were sent in, disguised as civilians.

==== Russian invasion of Ukraine ====
Russian Spetsnaz units have been used in the Russian invasion of Ukraine beginning in early 2022, they were initially tasked with going after high-ranking Ukrainian officials, including president Volodymyr Zelenskyy in order to decapitate the Ukrainian command and control structure, with the objective being to foster chaos. Like other Russian plans during the start of the invasion, the Russian Spetsnaz failed to take out Zelenskyy and the Ukrainian leadership.

The Russian military was not dissuaded by the failure, and continued to use spetsnaz in the conflict, particularly deploying them when conventional Russian forces faced significant resistance. This caused the heavy attrition rate suffered by the Russian forces to also reach the Russian Spetsnaz, according to a Pentagon leak in April 2023, all but one of five Spetsnaz brigades that had participated in the war had suffered significant losses by late summer 2022. According to the estimate, one of the separate Spetsnaz brigades in question had only ″125 personnel active out of 900 deployed.″ The casualties were expected to have increased following the Ukrainian counteroffensive in September 2022 that liberated hundreds of square miles of territory in a few days, during this offensive, the GRU's Third Guards Spetsnaz Brigade, considered one of the most elite Russian units, was caught in the retreat and had to fight a defensive action in the town of Lyman. A report by the BBC assessed that the Spetsnaz unit lost up to 75% of its men during this action.

The high amount of losses suffered in Ukraine are expected to leave a strategic capability gap, since special forces unlike conventional units cannot be ″mass-produced″, the leaked Pentagon documents estimated that it would take Russia up to ten years to reconstitute its special operations capability, and this estimate referred to outdated 2022 figures. Although there are no figures concerning Spetsnaz losses after the summer of 2022, the extremely heavy losses suffered by the entire Russian forces suggest that Spetsnaz units have continued to take significant losses in the invasion.

=== Syrian Civil War ===
"War on the Rocks" reports that various Russian special missions units have been openly supporting Syrian army units, and along with the Russian Aerospace Forces, have been invaluable in pushing back anti-government forces.

At the peak of the deployment, there was a detachment of approximately 250 GRU spetsnaz soldiers, probably drawn from several units, including naval spetsnaz from the 431st Naval Reconnaissance Point, while SOF operators from the KSSO, reportedly conducted mainly sniper/counter-sniper, sabotage and reconnaissance missions behind enemy lines.

== Structure ==
=== Soviet Union ===
Russian military theorist Colonel Mikhail Svechnykov originally proposed the concept of using special tactics and strategies. Svechnykov (executed during the Great Purge in 1938), envisaged the development of unconventional warfare capabilities to overcome disadvantages faced by conventional forces in the field. In the 1930s the "grandfather of the spetsnaz", Ilya Starinov, began the implementation of the idea.

During World War II, Red Army reconnaissance and sabotage detachments formed under the supervision of the Second Department of the General Staff of the Soviet Armed Forces. These forces were subordinate to front commanders. The infamous NKVD internal-security and espionage agency also had their own special purpose (osnaz) detachments, including many saboteur teams who were airdropped into enemy-occupied territories to work with (and often take over and lead) the Soviet Partisans.

In 1950 Georgy Zhukov advocated the creation of 46 military spetsnaz companies, each consisting of 120 servicemen. This was the first use of "spetsnaz" to denote a separate military branch since World War II. These companies were later expanded to battalions and then to brigades. However, some separate companies (orSpN) and detachments (ooSpN) existed with brigades until the dissolution of the Soviet Union.

The special-purpose forces of the Armed Forces of the Soviet Union included fourteen land brigades, two naval brigades and a number of separate detachments and companies, operating under the Main Intelligence Directorate (GRU) and collectively known as Spetsnaz GRU. These units and formations existed in the highest possible secrecy, disguised as Soviet paratroopers (Army spetsnaz) or naval infantrymen (Naval spetsnaz) by their uniforms and insignia.

Twenty-four years after the birth of spetsnaz, the Chairman of the KGB General Yuri Andropov (in that office from 1967 to 1982) established the first counter-terrorist unit. From the late 1970s through to the 1980s, a number of special-purpose units were founded in the KGB (1954–1991) and in the Ministry of Internal Affairs (MVD) (1946–1954).

==== KGB ====
Spetsgruppa 'A' (Alpha Group) counter-terrorist unit was created in 1974.

Spetsgruppa "V", abbreviation of the Directorate в (Russian Cyrillic for V), also known as "Vega" in period 1993–1995, was formed in 1981, merging two elite Cold War-era KGB special units—Cascade (Kaskad) and Zenith (Zenit)—which were similar to the CIA's Special Activities Division (responsible for clandestine / covert operations involving sabotage and assassination in other countries) and re-designated for counter-terrorist and counter-sabotage operations.

==== MVD ====
These were special forces of the MVD Internal Troops.

=== Post-Soviet ===
During the 1990s special detachments were established within the Federal Penitentiary Service (FSIN) and the Airborne Troops (VDV). Some civil agencies with non-police functions have formed special units also known as spetsnaz, such as the Leader special centre in the Ministry of Emergency Situations (MChS).

In total, by December 1991, at the time of the collapse of the USSR, the GRU reconnaissance and sabotage formations had:

- 14 special purpose brigades
- 2 special purposes regiments
- 29 independent special purpose companies
- 5 naval reconnaissance point

In Russia, in 2013 a Special Operations Forces Command was established for Special Operations Forces which had earlier been established from around 2009 following a study of Western special-operations forces units and commands. The Command was not under the control of the GRU but reported directly to the General Staff – as did the GRU.

== Belarusian spetsnaz ==
The 5th Spetsnaz Brigade is a special forces brigade of the Armed Forces of Belarus, formerly part of the Soviet spetsnaz. In addition, the State Security Committee (KGB) of Belarus that was formed from the inherited personnel and operators after the break up of the Soviet Union. KGB of Belarus has its own Spetsgruppa "A" (Alpha Group), which is the country's primary counter-terrorism unit.

== Kazakh spetsnaz ==
As with many post Soviet states, Kazakhstan adopted the term Alpha Group to be used by its special forces. The Almaty territorial unit of Alpha was turned into the special unit Arystan (meaning "Lions" in Kazakh) of the National Security Committee (KNB) of Kazakhstan. In 2006, five members of Arystan were arrested and charged with the kidnapping of the opposition politician Altynbek Sarsenbayuly, his driver, and his bodyguard; the three victims were then allegedly delivered to the people who murdered them.

Kokhzal (meaning wolf pack in Kazakh language) is a special forces unit of Kazakhstan responsible for carrying out anti terror operations as well as serving as a protection detail for the President of Kazakhstan.

== Russian spetsnaz after 2010 ==
=== Administrative history ===
The elite units of the Armed Forces of the Russian Federation are controlled, for the most part, by the military-intelligence GRU (Spetsnaz GRU) under the General Staff. They were heavily involved in secret operations and training pro-Russian forces in the civil war in Chechnya during the 1990s and 2000s. In 2010, as a result of the 2008 Russian military reform, GRU special forces came under the control of the Russian Ground Forces, being "directly subordinated to commanders of combined strategic commands." However, in 2013, these spetsnaz forces were placed back under the GRU. The Russian Airborne Troops (VDV, a separate branch of the Soviet and Russian Armed Forces) includes the 45th Guards Spetsnaz Brigade. In 2009, a Directorate of Special Operations was established that reported directly to the General Staff not the GRU to establish the Special Operations Forces which in 2013 became the Special Operations Forces Command. Most Russian military special forces units are known by their type of formation (company, battalion or brigade) and a number, like other Soviet or Russian military units. Two exceptions were the ethnic Chechen Special Battalions Vostok and Zapad (East and West) that existed during the 2000s. The "Structure" chapter contains the list of special purpose units of the Russian Armed Forces.

=== Training ===
The FSB Spetsnaz maintain a training base near the village of Averkyevo. There is a "killing house" providing training similar to the SAS close to Moscow.

=== Uniform ===
Russian special forces wear different berets depending on the branch of the armed forces they belong to. These include:

- Ground Forces and Airborne Forces – Blue beret
- Navy and Marines – Black beret
- National Guard – Maroon beret

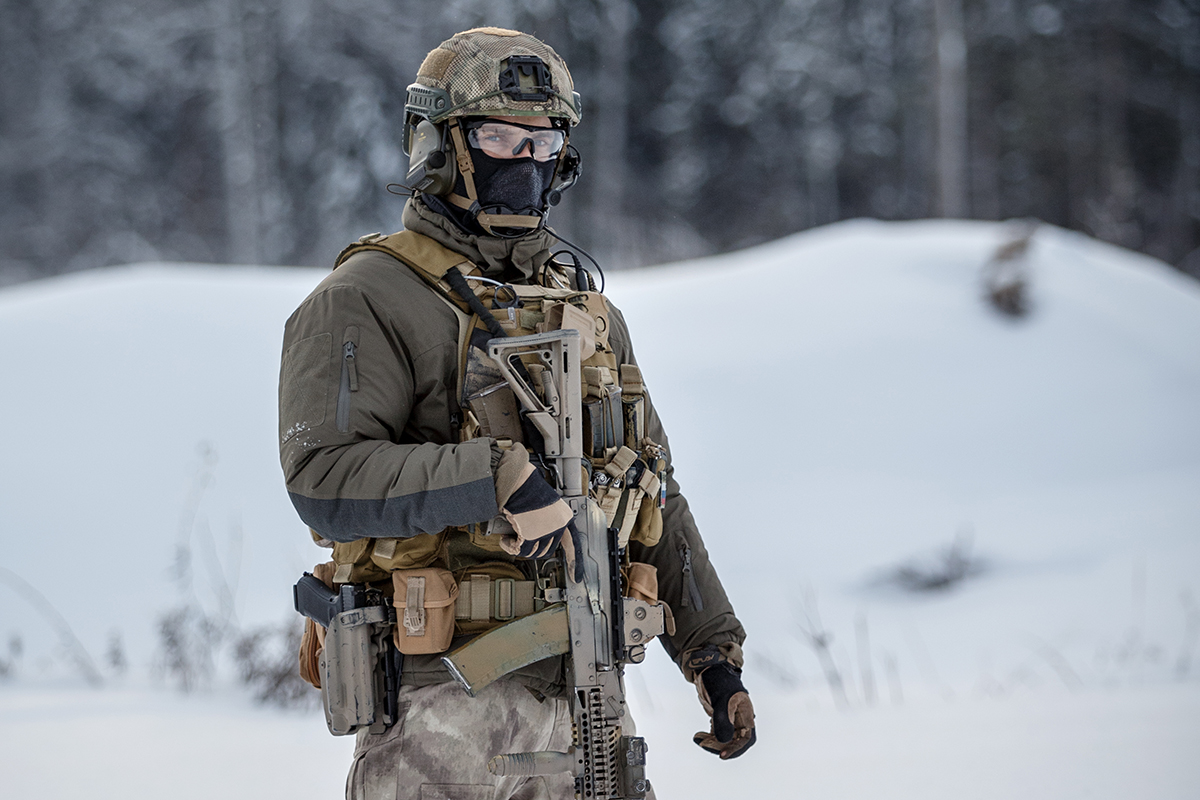
Russian Spetsnaz SSO operative

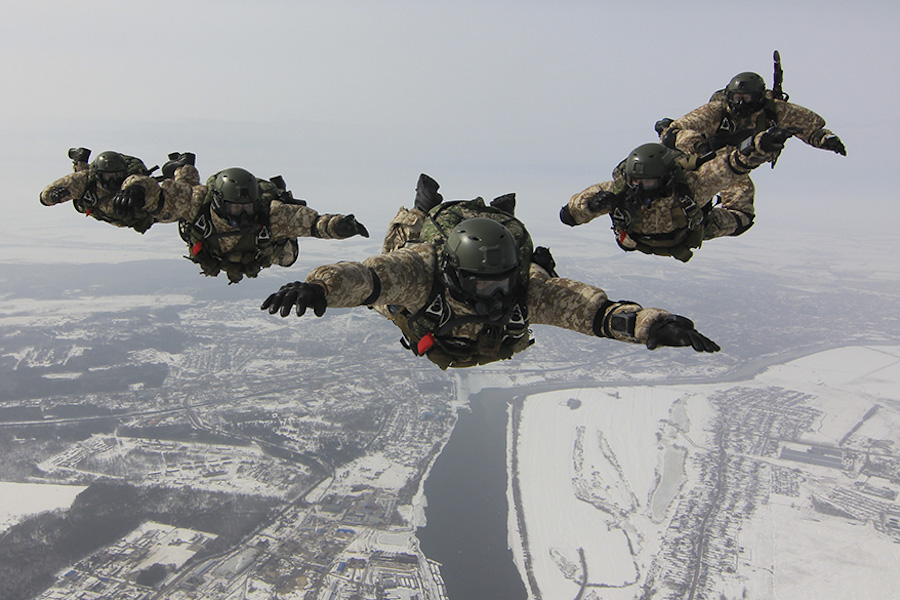
Russian SOF during HALO training.

=== Structure ===
==== Ground Forces ====
Special Operations Forces Command (KSSO)

- Special Operations Forces (SOF)
  - Special Purpose Center "Senezh"
  - Special Purpose Center "Kubinka-2"
  - Special Purpose Center "Terskol"
  - 54th Special Reconnaissance Center
  - 561st Naval Rescue Center
  - 344th Army Aviation Combat Center

==== Main Intelligence Directorate (GRU) ====
- Special Forces of the Main Directorate of the General Staff of the Russian Armed Forces (Spetsnaz GRU)

Following units belong to their specific military branches, but come under GRU operational control during wartime operations.

- Russian Ground Forces – fields 7 spetsnaz brigades of varying sizes and one spetsnaz regiment.
  - 2nd Spetsnaz Brigade – based in Promezhitsa, Pskov Oblast
    - Brigade HQ
      - Signals Battalion (2x Company)
      - Support Company
    - 70th Special Purpose Detachment
    - 329th Special Purpose Detachment
    - 700th Special Purpose Detachment
    - Training Battalion (2x Company)
  - 3rd Guards Spetsnaz Brigade – based in Tolyatti
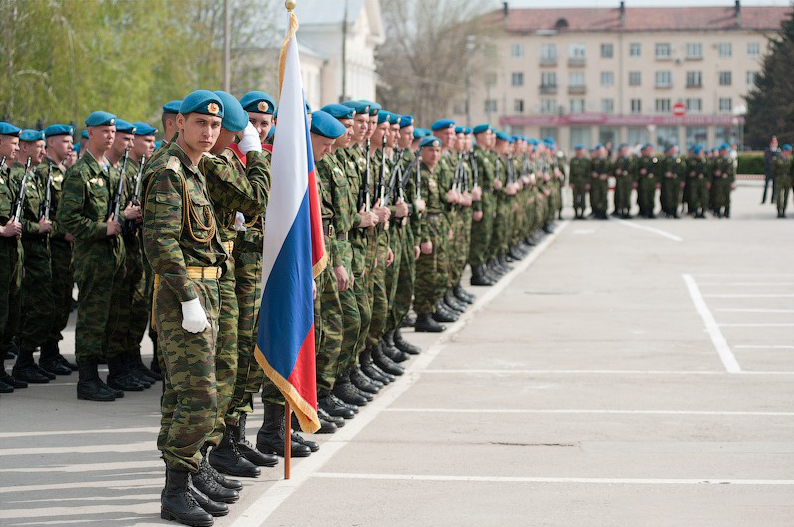
    Russian 3rd Spetsnaz Brigade on parade, 9 May 2011
    - Brigade HQ
      - Signals Company
      - Special Weapons Company
      - Support Company
      - Logistics Company
    - 1st Special Purpose Detachment (1st Battalion)
    - 790th Special Purpose Detachment (2nd Battalion)
    - 791st Special Purpose Detachment (3rd Battalion)
    - Training School
  - 10th Spetsnaz Brigade – based in Mol'kino, Krasnoyarsk Territory
    - Brigade HQ
      - Signals Company
      - Special Weapons Company
      - Support Company
      - Logistics Company
      - K-9 Unit
    - 325th Special Purpose Detachment
    - 328th Special Purpose Detachment
    - Training Battalion (2x Company)
  - 14th Spetsnaz Brigade – based in Ussuriysk
    - Brigade HQ
      - Signals Company
      - Logistics Company
    - 282nd Special Purpose Detachment
    - 294th Special Purpose Detachment
    - 308th Special Purpose Detachment
    - Training Battalion (2x Company)
  - 16th Guards Spetsnaz Brigade – based in Tambov, with all units deployed in Tambov except for the 664th SPD.
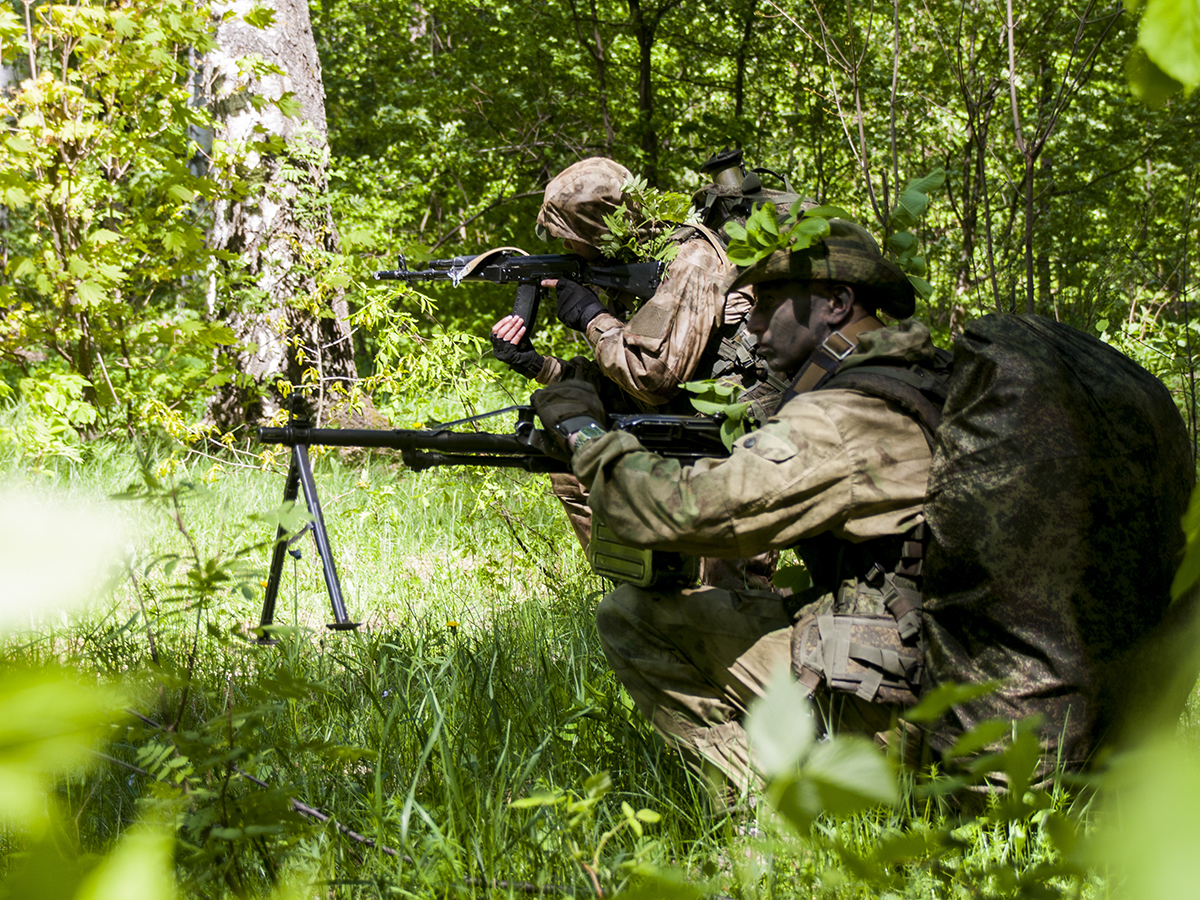
    Russian 370th SPD conducting special reconnaissance training (2017)
    - Brigade HQ
      - EOD company
      - Signals Company
      - Logistics Company
    - 370th Special Purpose Detachment
    - 379th Special Purpose Detachment
    - 585th Special Purpose Detachment
    - 664th Special Purpose Detachment
    - 669th Special Purpose Detachment
  - 22nd Spetsnaz Brigade – entire unit is based in Stepnoi, Rostov Oblast
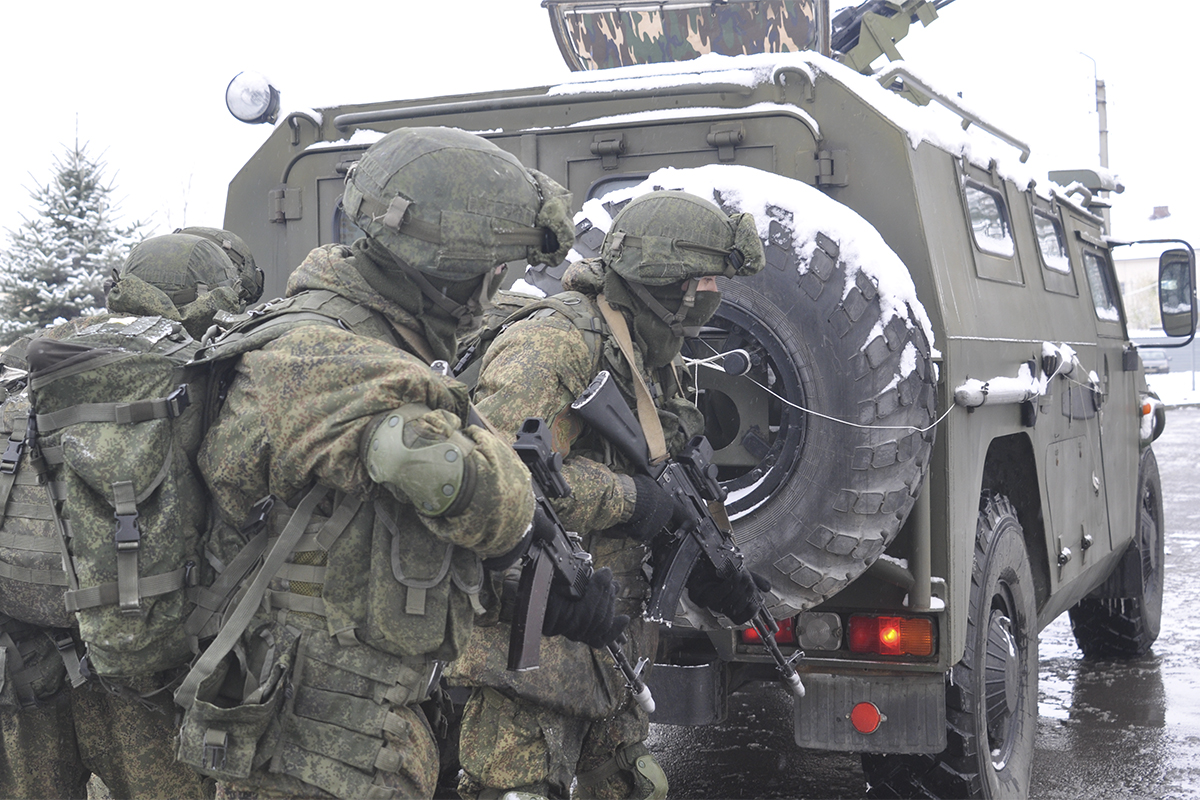
    Russian 22nd SPB operatives conducting winter Anti-Terrorist training (2017)
    - Brigade HQ
      - Signals Company
      - Support Company
      - Special Weapons Company
      - Logistics Unit
      - Engineer Unit
    - 108th Special Purpose Detachment
    - 173rd Special Purpose Detachment
    - 305th Special Purpose Detachment
    - 411th Special Purpose Detachment
  - 24th Guards Spetsnaz Brigade – based in Irkutsk, with all units and units deployed in Irkutsk
    - Brigade HQ
      - Signals Company
      - Special Weapons Company
      - Logistics Unit
    - 281st Special Purpose Detachment
    - 297th Special Purpose Detachment
    - 641th Special Purpose Detachment
  - 25th Spetsnaz Regiment in Stavropol
- Russian Airborne Troops
  - 45th Special Purpose Airborne Brigade

==== Navy ====
- Naval Special Reconnaissance (OMRP) – Reconnaissance divers under operational subordination to the Main Intelligence Directorate (GRU).
  - 42nd Marine Reconnaissance point (Pacific Fleet)
  - 388th Marine Reconnaissance point (Black Sea Fleet) – reorganized from the former 431st MRP
  - 420th Marine Reconnaissance point (Northern Fleet)
  - 561st Marine Reconnaissance point (Baltic Fleet)

Counteraction Underwater Diversionary Forces and Facilities (PDSS)

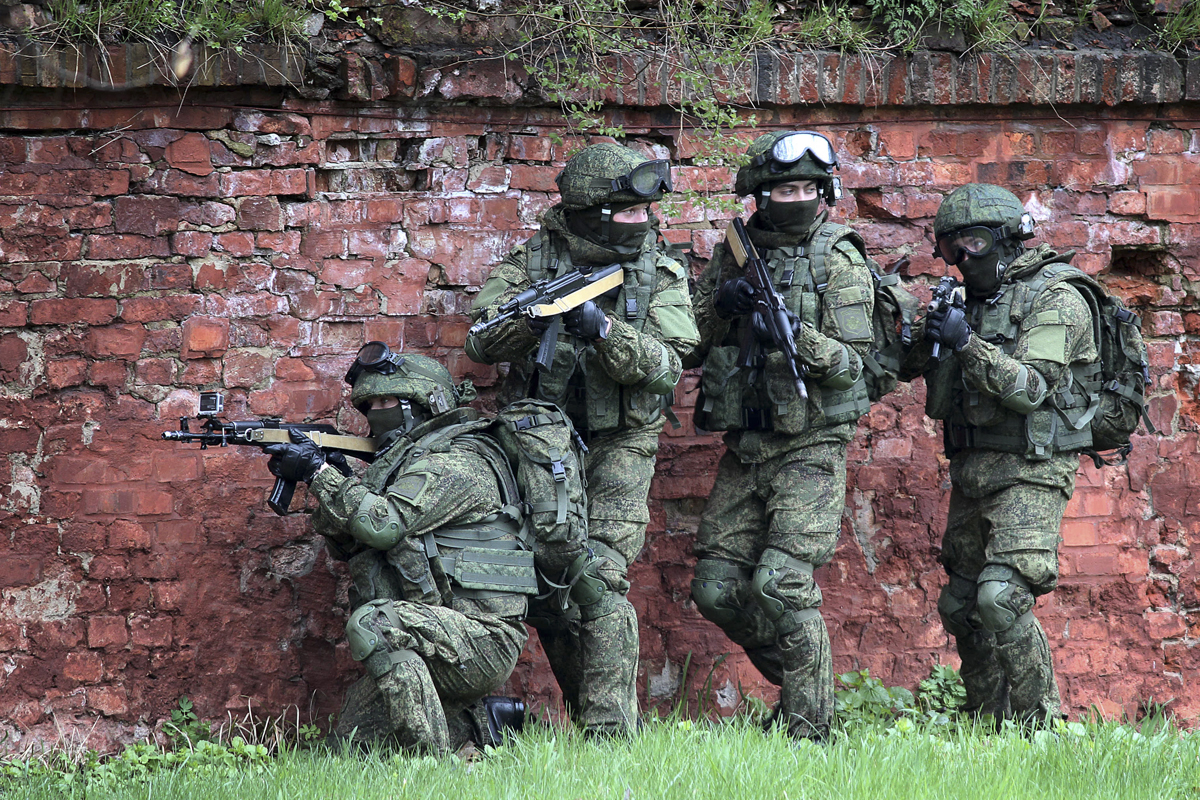
Combat swimmers of the Russian 313th PDSS conduct land operations.

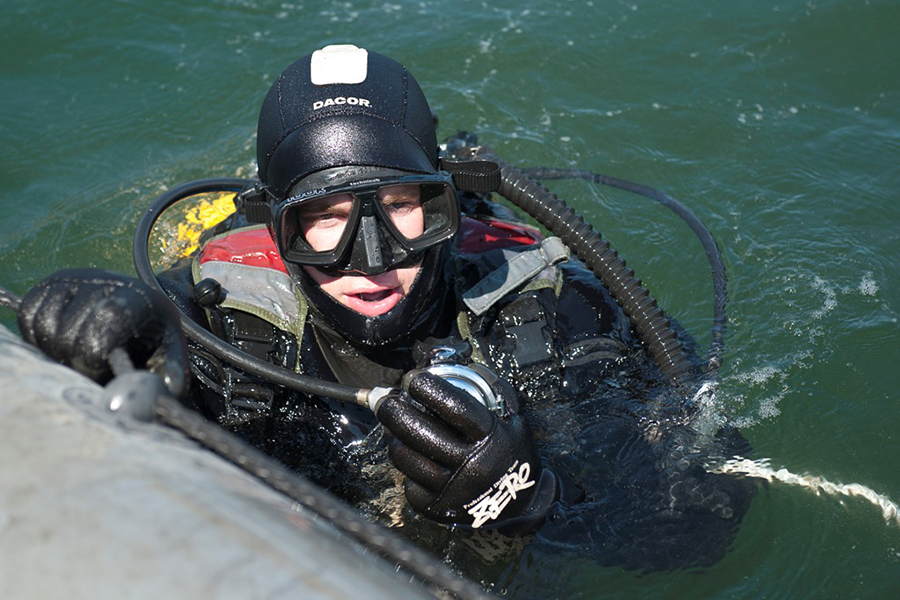
Combat swimmer from the Russian 311th PDSS in Kamchatka (2017)

The Russian Navy also fields dedicated maritime sabotage and counter-sabotage diver units. These units also include combat swimmers, trained to conduct underwater combat, mining and clearance diving. The task is to protect ships and other fleet assets from enemy underwater special forces. The term "combat swimmers" is correct term in relation to the staff of the OSNB PDSS. Every PDSS unit has approximately 50–60 combat swimmers. There are PDSS units in all major Naval Bases.

- 101st PDSS Detachment – based in Petropavlovsk-Kamchatsky
- 102nd PDSS Detachment – based in Sevastopol
- 136th PDSS Detachment – based in Novorossiysk
- 137th PDSS Detachment – based in Makhachkala
- 140th PDSS Detachment – based in Vidyayevo
- 152nd PDSS Detachment – based in Polyarny, Murmansk Oblast
- 153rd PDSS Detachment – based in Ostrovnoy, Murmansk Oblast
- 159th PDSS Detachment – based in Razboynik
- 160th PDSS Detachment – based in Murmansk
- 269th PDSS Detachment – based in Gadzhiyevo
- 311th PDSS Detachment – based in Petropavlovsk-Kamchatsky
- 313th PDSS Detachment – based in Baltiysk
- 473rd PDSS Detachment – based in Kronstadt

==== Federal Security Service (FSB) ====
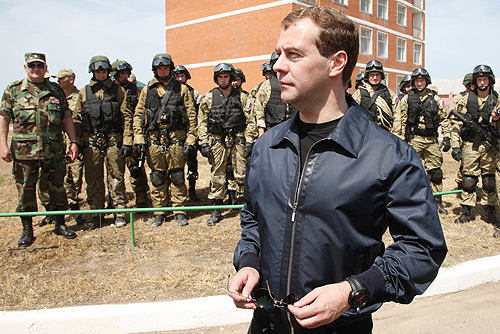
Then-Russian President Medvedev visiting Dagestan regional FSB special forces base in Makhachkala, 2009

The Centre of Special Operations of the FSB TsSN FSB, центр специального назначения ФСБ) is officially tasked with combating terrorism and protecting the constitutional order of the Russian Federation. The TsSN FSB consists of estimated 8,000 operators and personnel in at least 7 operative divisions:

- Directorate "A" (Spetsgruppa Alpha)
- Directorate "V" (Spetsgruppa Vympel)
- Directorate "S" (Spetsgruppa Smerch – Special Operations Executive – SOE) – TsSN of Moscow city and Moscow Oblast
- Directorate "K" (Spetsgruppa Kavkaz) – formerly Special Purpose unit for the city of Yessentuki
- Directorate "T" (Spetsgruppa Tavrida) (Crimea, previously – 2nd service "SN" of FSB)
- Special Weapons Combat Use Service (SV) – testing of new weapons in high-risk conditions
- Directorate "X" (Hacker) – ensuring cybersecurity of structures

TsSN FSB headquarters is a large complex of buildings and training areas, with dozens of hectares of land and scores of training facilities. The average training period for a TsSN officer is about five years.

Spetsgruppa 'A' (Alpha Group) is the premier counter-terrorism unit of the FSB. Consisting of about 720 personnel, of which about 250–300 are trained for assault operations and the rest are support personnel. These are dispersed in five operational detachments, including one permanent detachment in the Chechen Republic. Other units are stationed in Moscow, Krasnodar, Yekaterinburg and Khabarovsk. All Alpha operators undergo airborne, mountain and counter-sabotage dive training. Alpha has operated in other countries, most notably Operation Storm-333 on a mission to overthrow and kill Afghan president Hafizullah Amin).

Spetsgruppa "V", abbreviation of the Directorate в (Russian Cyrillic for V), also known as "Vega" in period 1993–1995, was formed in 1981, continues the lineage of two elite Cold War-era KGB special units—Cascade (Kaskad) and Zenith (Zenit). Its modern function is the protection of strategic installations, such as factories and transportation centers. With its Alpha counterparts, it is heavily used in the North Caucasus. Vympel has four operative units in Moscow, with branch offices in nearly every city containing a nuclear power plant.

Spetsgruppa "S", abbreviation of the Directorate C (Russian Cyrillic for S), also known as Smerch, but also known as the Special Operations Executive (SOE), is a relatively new unit formed in July 1999. Officers from Smerch are frequently involved with the capture and transfer of various bandit and criminal leaders who help aid disruption in the North Caucasus and throughout Russia. Operations include both direct action against bandit holdouts in Southern Russia as well as high-profile arrests in more densely populated cities and guarding government officials. Because of its initials, this group is casually referred to as "Smerch". With the Centre of Special Operations and its elite units, many FSB special forces units operate at the regional level. These detachments are usually known as ROSN or ROSO (Regional Department of Special Designation), such as Saint Petersburg's Grad (Hail) or Murmansk's Kasatka (Orca).

==== Foreign Intelligence Service ====
The SVR RF, formerly the First Chief Directorate of the KGB of the USSR, has its own top secret elite special force within the Operations Department of Directorate Z known as Zaslon (Заслон) (meaning Screen, Barrier or Shield) about which extremely little is known. Formerly in PGU KGB SSSR called Vympel (e.g. French counterpart; Action Division).

However, mere existence of such group within SVR is denied by Russian authorities. Nevertheless, there were some rumors that such group does indeed exist and is assigned to execute very specific special operations abroad primarily for protection of Russian embassy personnel and internal investigations. It is believed that the group is deep undercover and consists of approximately 300–500 highly experienced operatives speaking several languages and having extensive record of operations while serving in other secret units of the Russian military.

==== National Guard ====
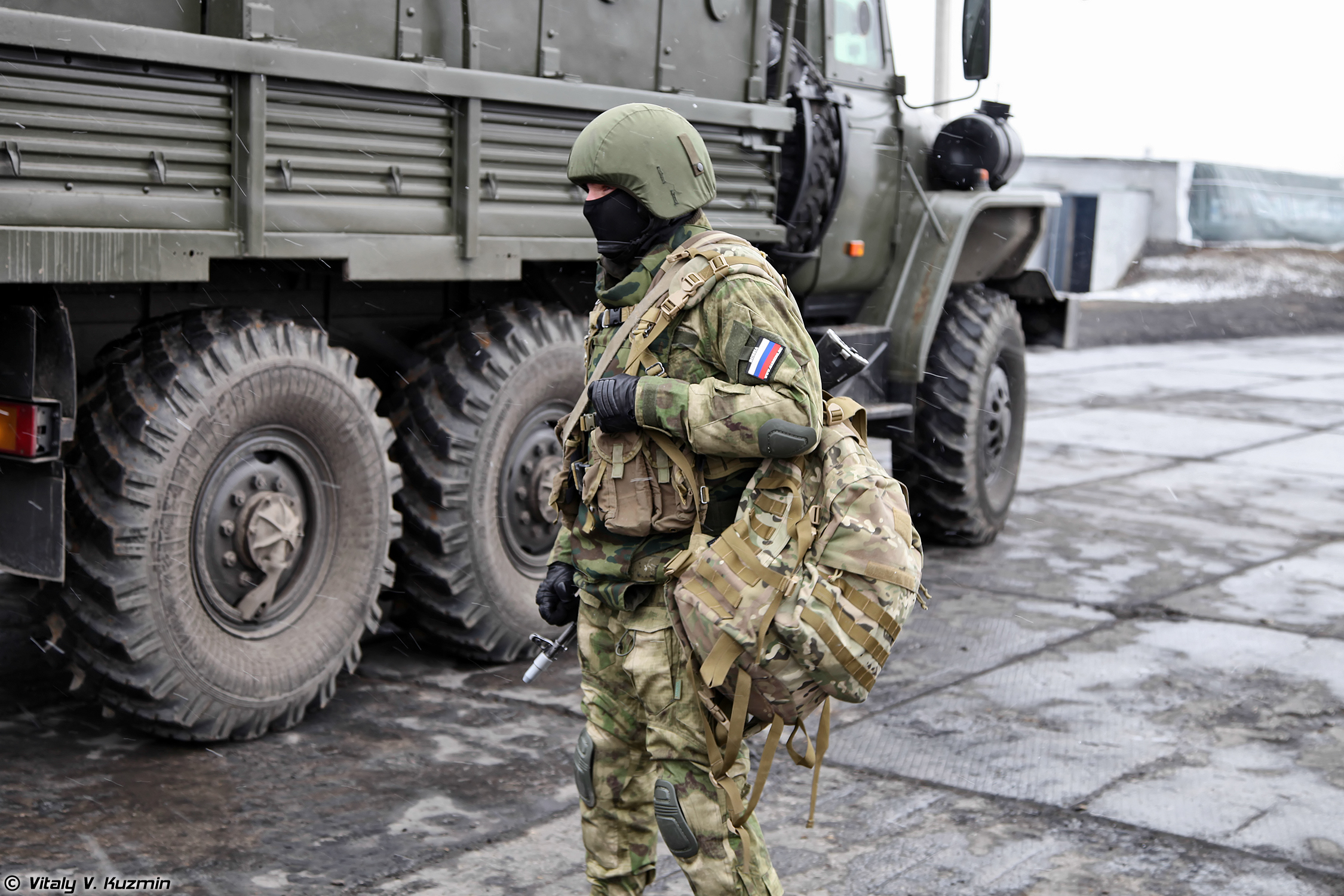
Russian 604th Special Purpose Centre operator

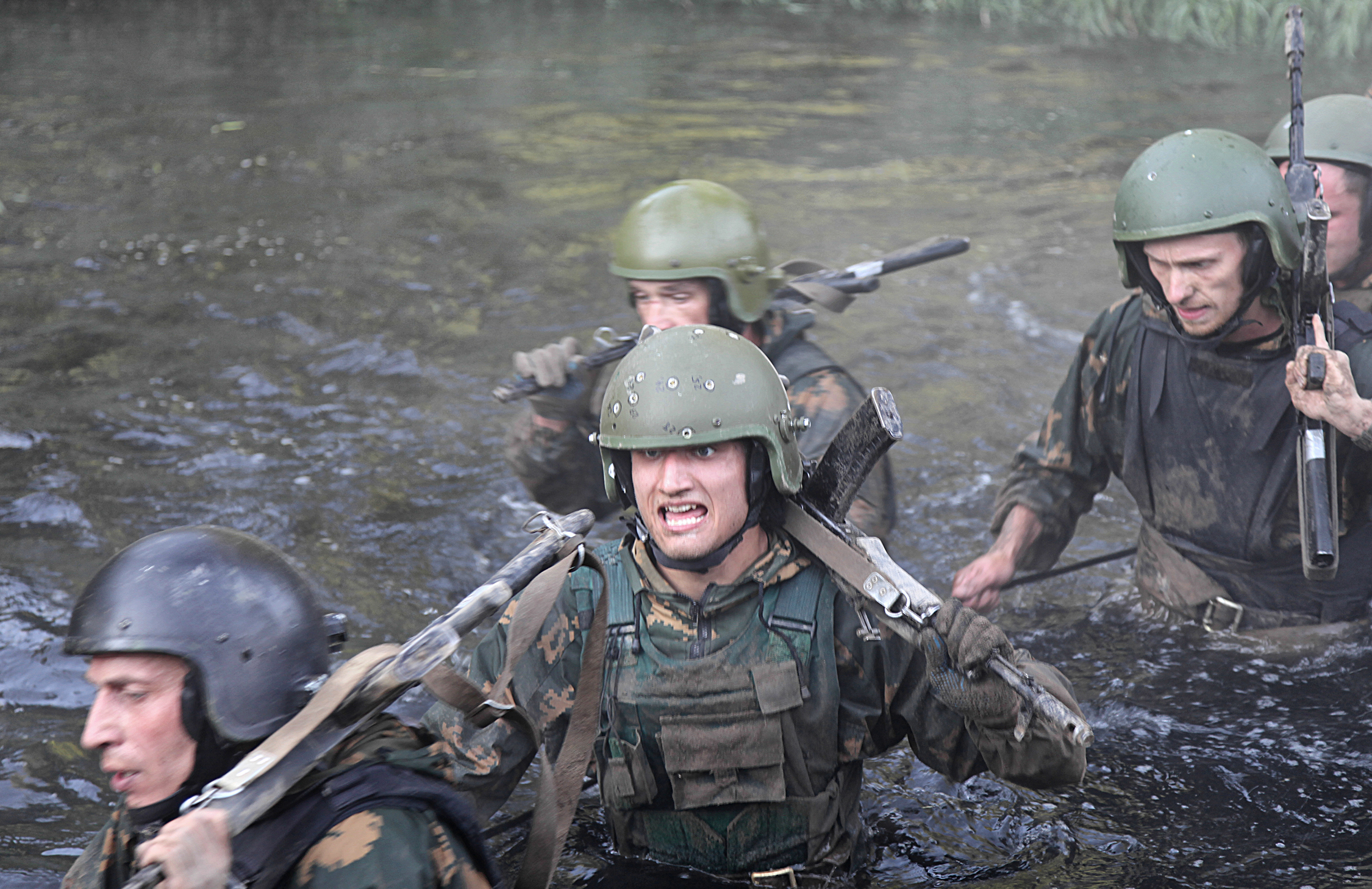
Water obstacle phase during tryouts for the Russian OSN Maroon Beret.

The Russian government established the National Guard of Russia in 2016. The Guard's special forces (consolidating and replacing the forces of the MVD Internal Troops, SOBR, and OMON) includes a number of Russian Internal Troops (VV, Russian: Внутренние войска (ВВ), romanized: Vnutrenniye voiska, successors to the Soviet Internal Troops) paramilitary units to combat internal threats to the government, such as insurgencies and mutinies. These units usually have a unique name and an official OSN (previously known as OSNAZ (Russian: ОСНАЗ) or Отряд особого назначения (Otryad osobogo naznacheniya) meaning "special purpose unit") number, and some are part of the ODON (also known as the Dzerzhinsky Division). OBrON (Independent Special Designation Brigade) VV special groups (spetsgruppa) were deployed to Chechnya.

The following is a list of National Guard OSNs (отряды специального назначения, otryady spetsial'novo naznacheniya or "special purpose detachments") in 2012:

- Dzerzhinsky Division (O.D.O.N.)
  - 604th Special Purpose Center
- 7th OSN Rosich (Novocherkassk)
- 12th OSN Ural (Nizhny Tagil)
- 15th OSN Vyatich (Armavir)
- 17th OSN Edelveys (Mineralnye Vody)
- 19th OSN Ermak (Novosibirsk)
- 21st OSN Tayfun (Sosnovka)
- 23rd OSN Mechel (Chelyabinsk)
- 25th OSN Merkuriy (Smolensk)
- 26th OSN Bars (Kazan)
- 27th OSN Kuzbass (Kemerovo)
- 28th OSN Ratnik (Arkhangelsk)
- 29th OSN Bulat (Ufa)
- 30th OSN Svyatogor (Stavropol)
- 33rd OSN Peresvet (Moscow)
- 34th OSN Skif (Grozny)
- 35th OSN Rus (Simferopol)

Furthermore, the Internal Troops of the Ministry of Internal Affairs of the USSR/Russia also had numerous naval detachments that conducted maritime operations. These include:

- 1st Marine Detachment of the MVD (Khabarovsk);
- 2nd Marine Detachment of the MVD (Murmansk);
- 31st Marine Training Detachment of the MVD (Severobaikalsk);
- 32nd Marine Detachment of the MVD (Ozersk)

These detachments today form the National Guard Naval Service Corps and report to the National Guard HQ.

==== Ministry of Internal Affairs (MVD) ====
The vast majority of MVD special forces were transferred to the National Guard in 2016.

Previously, the MVD had Politsiya (police, formerly Militsiya) special forces stationed in nearly every Russian city. Most of Russia's special-police officers belong to OMON units, which are primarily used as riot police and not considered an elite force—unlike the SOBR (known as the OMSN from 2002 to 2011) rapid-response units consisting of experienced, better-trained and -equipped officers. The Chechen Republic has unique and highly autonomous special-police formations, supervised by Ramzan Kadyrov (who has served as Head of the Chechen Republic since 2007) and formed from the Kadyrovtsy, including the (Akhmad or Akhmat) Kadyrov Regiment ("Kadyrov's spetsnaz").

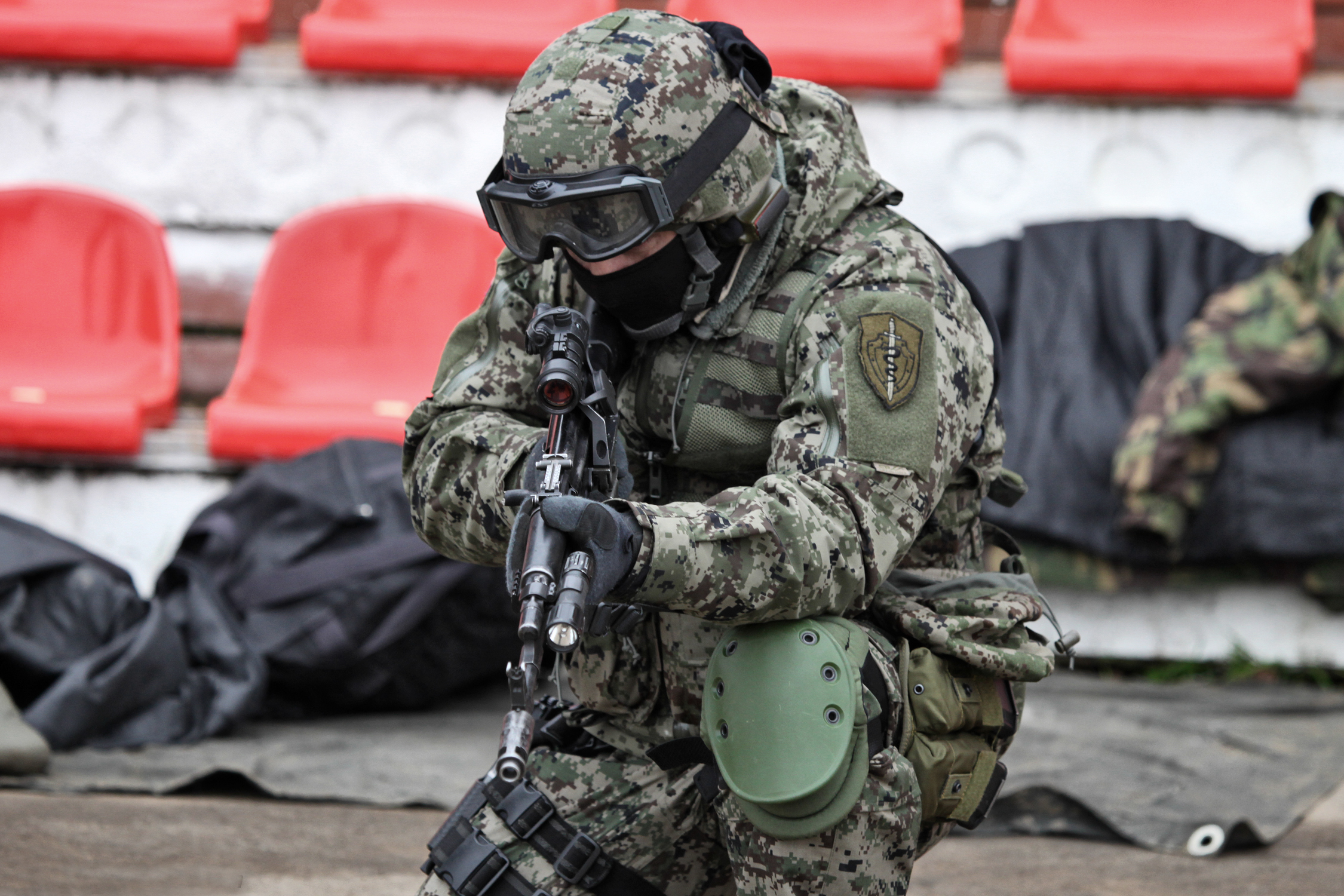
SURPAT wearing OSN "Grom" operator of the Russian Federal Drug Control Service.

From 2003 until 2016 The Federal Drug Control Service of Russia has operated the OSN "Grom", which became part of the Federal Police in April 2016, and now is subordinate to the MVD's Main Directorate for Drugs Control.

==== Ministry of Justice ====
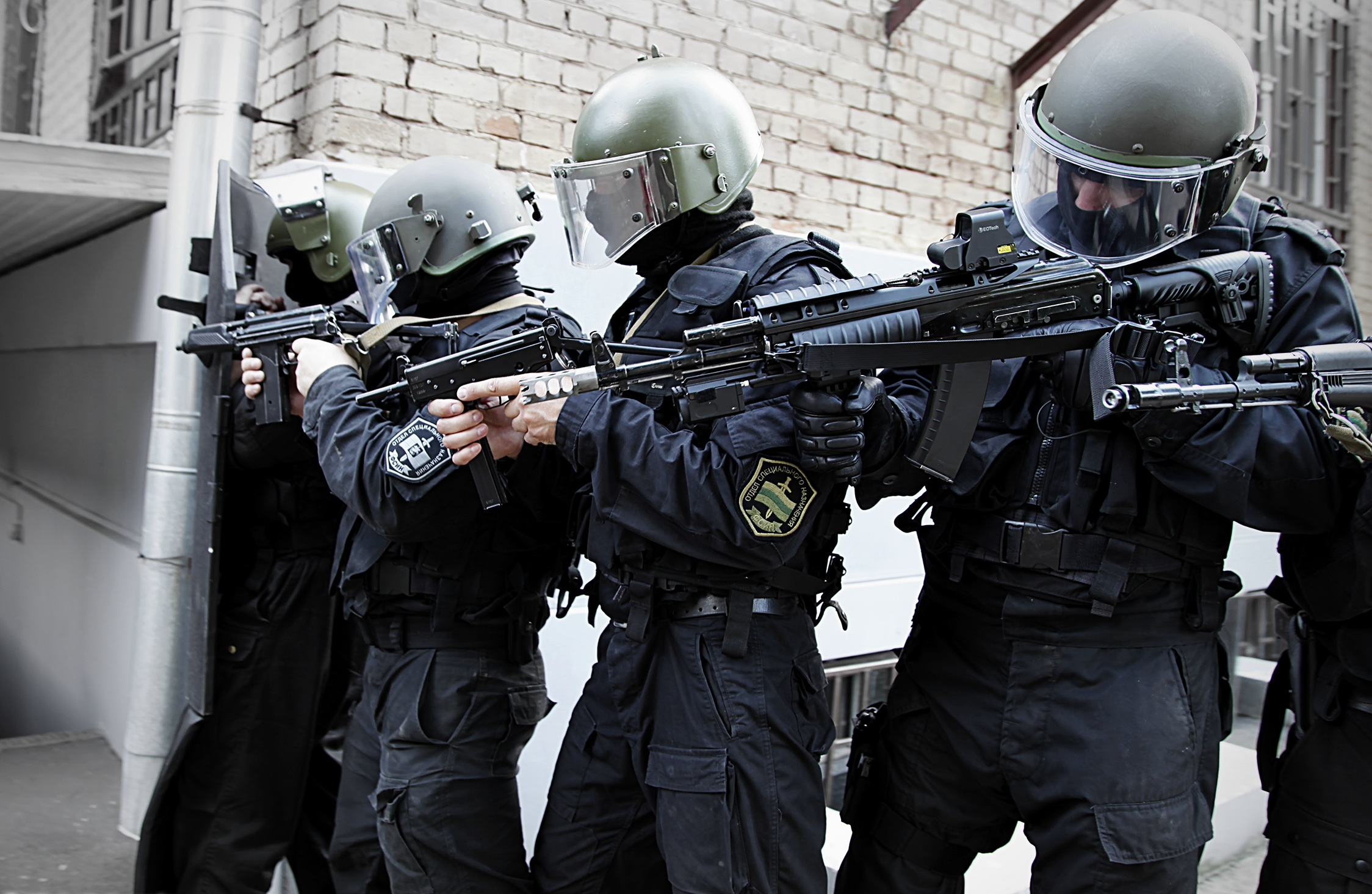
Russian FSIN Special Forces during a FAB Defense training exercise

The Russian Ministry of Justice maintains several spetsnaz organizations:

The following is a list of Federal Penitentiary Service OSNs:

- OSN "Fakel"
- OSN "Rossy"
- OSN "Akula"
- OSN "Ajsberg"
- OSN "Gyurza"
- OSN "Korsar"
- OSN "Rosomakha"
- OSN "Sokol"
- OSN "Saturn"
- OSN "Tornado"
- OSN "Kondor"
- OSN "Yastreb"
- OSN "Berkut"
- OSN "Grif"
- OSN "Titan"
- OSN "Gepard"

== Ukrainian spetsnaz ==
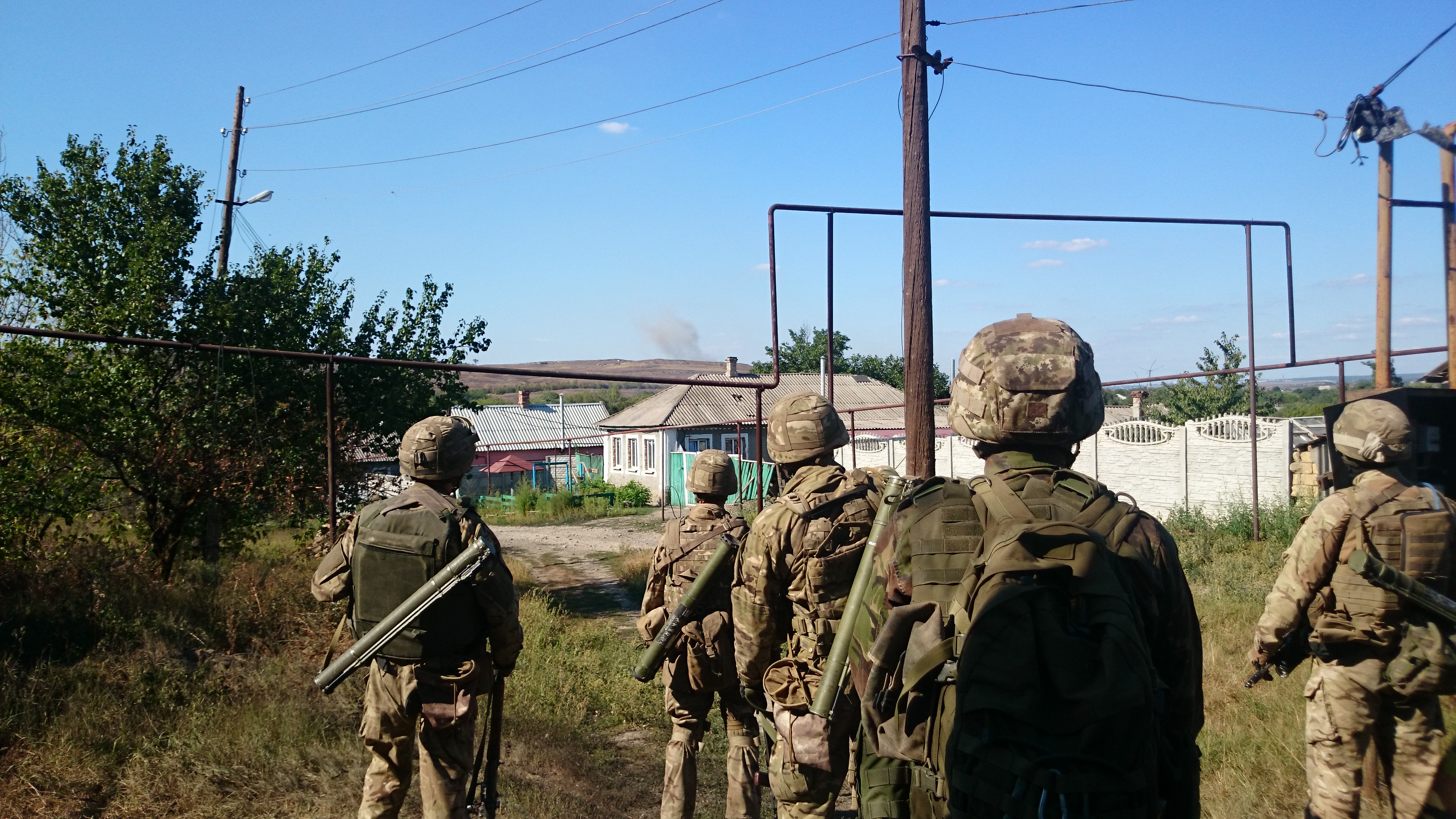
8th Spetsnaz Regiment operators moving into a village druing the Donbas War in 2014

Like many other post-Soviet states, Ukraine inherited its spetsnaz units from the remnants of the Soviet armed forces, GRU and KGB units. Ukraine now maintains its own spetsnaz structure under the control of the Ministry of Interior, and under the Ministry of Defence, while the Security Service of Ukraine maintains its own spetsnaz force, the Alpha group. The term "Alpha" is also used by many other post Soviet states such as Russia, Belarus, and Kazakhstan as these units are based on the Soviet Union's Alpha Group. Ukraine's Berkut special police force gained mainstream attention during the 2014 Revolution of Dignity as it was alleged to have been used by the government to quell the uprising. However, this is disputed as many officers were also wounded and killed in the action. After the War in Donbas, Ukraine went into a large-scale reform of its military forces, with the creation of new special forces units being created and adopting a NATO-inspired model. Current Ukrainian spetsnaz units with Soviet lineage:

- 3rd Spetsnaz Regiment – formed on the basis of the 10th Spetsnaz Brigade
- 8th Spetsnaz Regiment – formed on the basis of the 8th Spetsnaz Brigade
- 73rd Maritime Special Operations Center – formed on the basis of the 17th Naval Spetsnaz Brigade
- Ukraine's Alpha Group (SBU) – formed on the basis of Kyiv-based 10th Group of the KGBs Alpha Group

== In popular culture ==
The video game, Tom Clancy's Rainbow Six Siege features five spetsnaz operators named Glaz, Fuze, Kapkan, Tachanka, and Finka. In another Tom Clancy game, Endwar, Spetsnaz Guard Brigades is the name of the élite branch of the Russian army. The spetsnaz have also been referenced and featured multiple times in the video game series Call of Duty, mainly in the Modern Warfare titles. Spetsnaz are also featured in multiple entries in the ARMA series.

Two gangsters in the Guy Ritchie film RocknRolla have a 'scar competition' in which they show healed wounds (and describe how they occurred) from injuries they incurred whilst on several spetsnaz operations.

Season 1, Episode 4 of MacGyver (2016 TV series) focuses on stopping spetsnaz agents from activating a Cold War era bomb.

== See also ==
- Special Operations Forces (Russia)
- Guards unit
- List of special forces units
- List of special police units
- Detachment A

== Sources ==
- Viktor Suvorov, Spetsnaz. The Story Behind the Soviet SAS, 1987, Hamish Hamilton, ISBN 0-241-11961-8
- David C. Isby, Weapons and Tactics of the Soviet Army, Jane's Publishing Company Limited, London, 1988
- Carey Schofield, The Russian Elite: Inside Spetsnaz and the Airborne Forces, Greenhill, London, 1993
