= International Documentary Film Festival Amsterdam =

Film festival

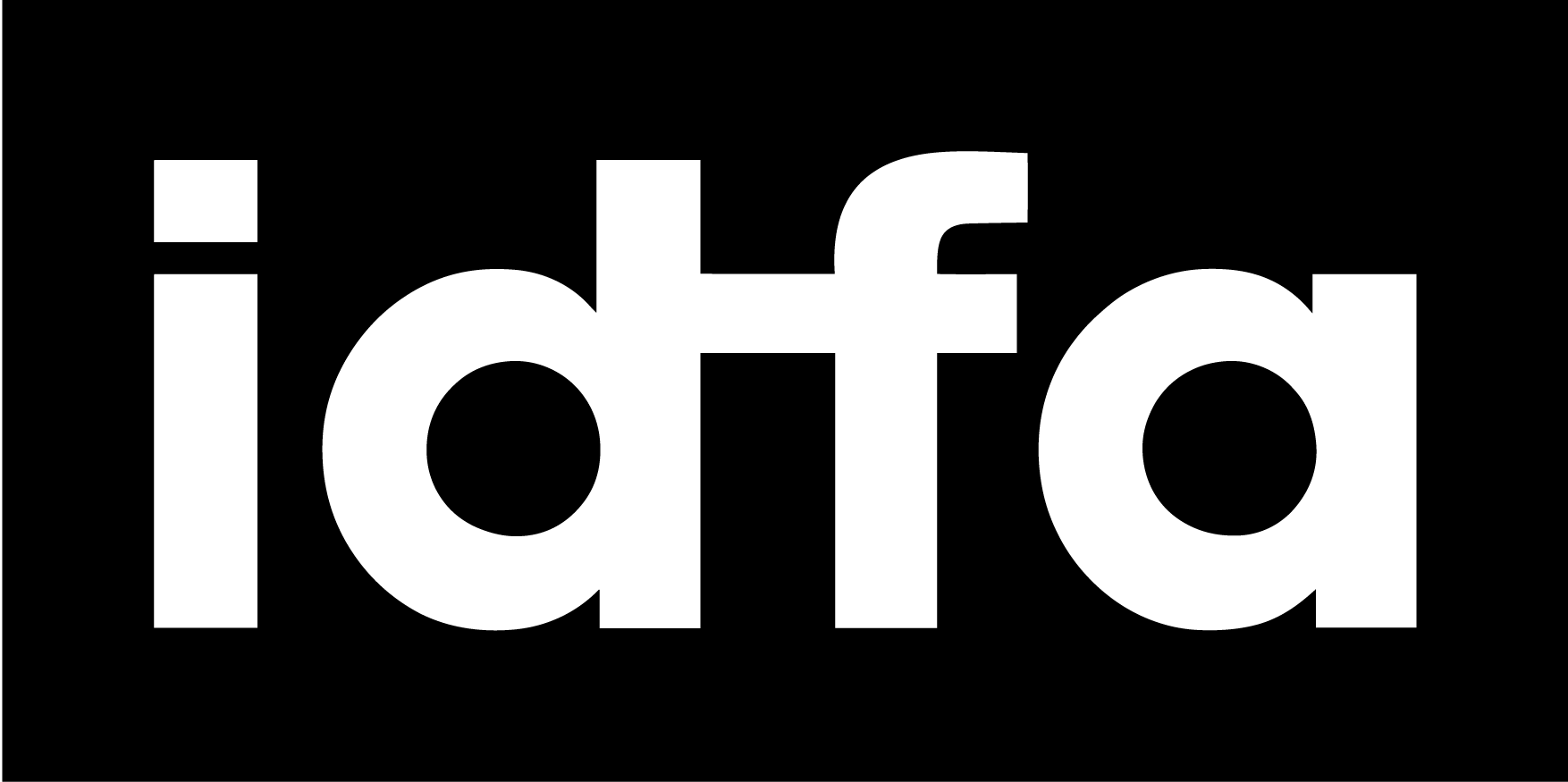
- Location: Amsterdam, Netherlands
- Founded: 1988
- Hosted by: IDFA
- Language: International
- Website: idfa.nl

The International Documentary Film Festival Amsterdam (IDFA) is the world's largest documentary film festival held annually since 1988 in Amsterdam, Netherlands.

== Description ==
IDFA is an independent, international meeting place for audiences and professionals to see a diverse (in form, content, and cultural background) program of high-quality documentaries. IDFA selects creative and accessible documentaries, which offer new insights into society. By 2009, IDFA had achieved the reputation of the most important doc fest. Every year in November, the festival takes place over the period of 11 days, in more than 40 venues around the city, welcoming an audience of 295.000 (2019), and a record number of documentary film professionals, as over 3500 gather for the festival, from more than 100 countries every year.

The festival was initially held at the Leidseplein area in the centre of Amsterdam. It has since spread to a number of other locations, including the Tuschinski Theatre and EYE Filmmuseum. Apart from its international film program, the variety of genres, and the many European and world premieres featured each year, the festival also hosts debates, forums, and workshops. Since 2007, the festival's New Media program IDFA DocLab showcases the best interactive non-fiction storytelling and explores how the digital revolution is reshaping documentary art. By that year, IDFA had grown to an audience of 145,000.

In addition to the festival, IDFA has developed several professional activities, contributing to the development of filmmakers and their films at all stages. At the co-financing and co-production market IDFA Forum filmmakers and producers pitch their plans to financiers; at Docs for Sale new documentaries are on offer to programmers and distributors; the IDFA Bertha Fund supports filmmakers and documentary projects in developing countries, and the IDFAcademy offers international training programs for up-and-coming doc talents.

== History ==
IDFA was founded as a successor to the Festikon, a festival of educational cinema founded by the Dutch Film Institute in 1961 and closed in 1987 due to the lack of interest of the audience. Menno van der Molen, Festikon's director, envisioned the new festival, entirely dedicated to documentaries. Van der Molen invited Ally Derks, who had joined Festikon's team as an intern in 1985, to prompt the idea and create IDFA. Derks headed IDFA from 1988 until 2017, when she stepped down. First colleagues that were invited to join the team were Derks' fellow Theatre and Film Studies graduates Adriek van Nieuwenhuyzen and Willemien van Aalst. As the festival's undoubted leader, Derks was nicknamed 'Madam IDFA' and 'the High Priestess of Documentaries', her vision was the one that shaped the event's program and profile for almost 30 years. In 2001, she installed 7 official 'pre-selectors', the Dutch film professionals, who evaluated the submissions and chose 500 that would qualify for further evaluation by Derks.

IDFA has always been politically charged and prioritised the socio-cultural impact of documentary cinema. As explained by the team, it was opened to “to be a platform for voices that are usually not listened to”.

In 2013, IDFA inaugurated the Emerging Voices from Southeast Asia program.

In 2016, Derks announced stepping down. In almost three decades under her rule, IDFA grew into the largest and most prestigious doc festival in the world. After Derks' resignation, Barbara Visser oversaw the 2017 edition as interim director. In January 2018, Syrian film producer Orwa Nyrabia was appointed new artistic director of IDFA.

Under Nyrabia, (January 2018 - June 2025), IDFA's programming and international presence changed substantially. Building on the work of Derks and the IDFA-affiliated IDFA Bertha Fund, he restructured the programs to become more international and inclusive, in terms of gender, cultural and geographical backgrounds, and in terms of artistic sensibility, IDFA represented a wider spectrum of documentary film and art forms and genres. In 2019 he introduced the non-competitive premier sections Luminous and Frontlight, and in 2021 the major Envision Competition, about which he said, "Films that seem to be a little too classical, although very well made, now have a natural home in the international competition while films that really go an extra mile when experimenting with form, do not seem to be too much when we have the new Envision Competition. We can accommodate a wider range of filmmaking approaches this way." He also introduced the section "IDFA On Stage" where live documentary cinema and performances with documentary elements were presented. Furthermore, Pathways were introduced in 2019 as a way of helping audiences navigate the festival's program thematically, and in the Industry part of the festival, a new structure was shaped between 2019 and 2022, with major change including the introduction of the Producers' Connection, a platform where producers from around the world present their projects to each other seeking collaboration rather than pitching only to funders. In 2023, IDFA moved to its new premises in Vondelpark, at the historical Vondelpark Pavilion building, which IDFA renamed Het Documentaire Paviljoen, with a new cinema hall, and multiple public-facing spaces. In November 2024, Nyrabia announced that he will be stepping down at the end of his contract by Summer of 2025. In a statement announcing his upcoming departure, IDFA said "Since taking the job in January 2018, Nyrabia and the team of IDFA revamped the festival’s film and industry programs and launched new platforms and initiatives that have become mainstays of the festival, such as the Envision Competition, IDFA On Stage, and the Producers Connection. Also, during this period, the organization achieved gender parity in its various offers. IDFA’s focus on expanding global representation in the sector was a key aspect throughout his tenure, now embedded into all processes, making it a one-of-a-kind gathering where the film community with all its diversity meet up and feel at home. During the past seven years, IDFA successfully navigated a pandemic, adapted and evolved with the shifting social and political realities, and the ever-changing documentary landscape". While the chair of the supervisory board, Lawyer Marry Fortman, said, "[Nyrabia's] influence in the artistic field lifted IDFA and has driven the festival as well as the organization to places we never knew they existed."

At the opening ceremony in held on 8 November 2023 in the shadow of the Gaza war, three activists burst onto the stage and waved a sign saying "From the river to the sea, Palestine will be free", to show solidarity with the people of Gaza. The audience, which included the festival director Orwa Nyrabia, applauded the activists. On 10 November members of Israel's film community condemned the use of the slogan and Nyrabia's applause, some demanding Nyrabia be fired, and others demanding that the Dutch government stops supporting the festival. Various petitions were launched online to lobby for that. After IDFA official apologized, a group of Palestinian filmmakers and others standing in solidarity withdrew from the festival and started a petition in protest. Following this challenge, Orwa Nyrabia announced that IDFA will organize an international symposium on the responsibilities of film organizations and festivals in times of global change.

== Prizes ==
In the first few years the festival had only the Joris Ivens competition. By 2007, it had four competition programs and the Audience Award, but the Joris Ivens Award (for feature-length documentaries) remained the main prize. Films in competition films must be world, international, or European premieres. The Joris Ivens Award was renamed the IDFA Award for Best Feature-Length Documentary after the 2008 edition, it was presented annually until 2020.

In 2021, IDFA announced a new program structure and introduced new central sections: Envision and International Competitions for over 40 and 60 min, respectively, flanked by several cross-section awards (Best Dutch Film, Best First Feature and ReFrame Award). As before, only premieres are allowed to compete in the main competition.

The best new documentaries of the year compete in IDFA's main competition programs:

- The IDFA Award for Best Feature-Length Documentary for best documentary longer than 70 minutes (€15,000 prize) + Special Jury Award
- The IDFA Award for Best Mid-Length Documentary for best documentary between 40 and 70 minutes (€10,000 prize) + Special Jury Award
- The IDFA Award for Best Short Documentary for best documentary under 40 minutes (€5,000 prize) + Special Jury Award
- The IDFA Award for Best First Appearance for best debut film (€10,000 prize) + Special Jury Award
- The IDFA Award for Best Student Documentary for best student documentary from film academies around the world (€5,000 prize) + Special Jury Award
- The Beeld en Geluid IDFA Award for Dutch Documentary for best Dutch documentary (€7,500 prize) + the Special Jury Award
- The Peter Wintonick Special Jury Award for First Appearance (inaugurated 2013, €7,500 prize).

Alongside the competition programs, five awards are awarded during IDFA:

- VPRO IDFA Audience Award for best film as voted by the audience (prize €5,000);
- Amsterdam Human Rights Award for the documentary that best depicts the theme of human rights (€25,000 prize);
- Prins Bernard Cultuurfonds Documentary Scholarship, a €50,000 grant for a documentary talent, allowing the recipient to make a documentary about a subject of their choice;
- Filmfonds DocLab Interactive Grant, a cash prize for the development of interactive projects within the Netherlands;
- Karen de Bok Talent Award for the winner of the IDFAcademy & NPO-fonds workshop. It is the successor of the Media Fund Award Documentary. The NPO Fund awards the winner €25,000 to further develop the project in collaboration with a producer and a broadcast.

== Program sections ==
In addition to the competitions, IDFA presents several non-competitive film programs:

=== Regular programs ===
- Masters

In this program section, the festival presents the latest documentaries by renowned documentary auteurs.

- Best of Fests

In Best of Fests, the festival presents films that have made an impact on the international festival circuit this year.

- Panorama

In this section, the festival presents films from all over the world, which are thought-provoking in their form and choice of theme.

- Paradocs

The films in this section showcase what is going on beyond the frame of traditional documentary filmmaking, on the borders between film and art, truth and fiction, and narrative and design.

- Music Documentary

Screenings of many films from this program are accompanied by live performances connected to the films.

=== Specials ===
In addition to the regular programs, each year the festival presents programs like Queer Day, featuring new documentaries about LGBTQ-related topics; Focus programs which zoom in on aspects like sound design, editing, and cinematography or a topical theme; a themed program by DocLab, featuring live events and an interactive exhibition; and a retrospective of a filmmaker who also chooses a personal documentary Top 10.

== Award winners ==
=== Best film ===
==== IDFA Award for Best Feature-Length Documentary (Until 2020, formerly: Joris Ivens Award) ====
Year	Film	Director	Nationality of director (at time of film's release)
1988	Birthplace Unknown	Karin Junger	Netherlands
1988	Ksjsiner	Ruben Gevorksjanz	Soviet Union
1989	Šķērsiela	Ivars Seleckis	Soviet Union
1990	Christo in Paris	D. Maysles	United States
1991	Dreams and Silence	Omar Al-Quattan	Belgium
1992	La Memoria del agua	Hector Faver	Spain
1993	Belovy	Viktor Kossakovsky	Russia
1994	Solo, de wet van de Favela	Jos de Putter	Netherlands
1995	Délits Flagrants	Raymond Depardon	France
1996	Atman	Pirjo Honkasalo	Finland / Germany
1997	Auf der Kippe	Andrei Schwartz	Germany
1998	Fotoamator / Photographer	Dariusz Jablonski	Poland
1999	André Hazes – Zij gelooft in mij	John Appel	Netherlands
2000	The Sea That Thinks	Gert de Graaff	Netherlands
2001	Family	Phie Ambo & Sami Saif	Denmark
2002	Stevie	Steve James	United States
2003	Checkpoint	Yoav Shamir	Israel
2004	Stand van de maan	Leonard Retel Helmrich	Netherlands
2005	My Grandmother's House	Adán Aliaga	Spain
2006	The Monastery: Mr. Vig and the Nun	Pernille Rose Grønkjær	Denmark
2007	Stranded	Gonzalo Arijon	France
2008	Burma VJ: Reporting from a Closed Country	Anders Østergaard	Denmark
2009	Last Train Home	Lixin Fan	Canada
2010	Position Among the Stars	Leonard Retel Helmrich	Netherlands
2011	Planet of Snail	Seung-jun Yi	South Korea
2012	First Cousin Once Removed	Alan Berliner	United States
2013	Song from the Forest	Michael Obert	Germany
2014	Of Men and War	Laurent Bécue-Renard	France / Switzerland
2015	Don Juan	Jerzy Sladkowski	Sweden / Finland
2016	Nowhere to Hide	Zaradasht Ahmed	Norway / Sweden
2017	The Other Side of Everything	Mila Turajlić	Serbia
2018	Reason	Anand Patwardhan	India
2019	In a Whisper	Heidi Hassan & Patricia Pérez Fernández	Cuba / Cuba
2020	Radiograph of a Family	Firouzeh Khosrovani	Iran
Category split as of 2020

==== Best Film Award International Competition ====
Year	Film	Director	Nationality of director (at time of film's release)
2021	Octopus	Karim Kassem	Lebanon / Qatar / United States
2022	Manifesto	Angie Vinchito	Russia
2023	1489	Shoghakat Vardanyan	Armenia
2024	Trains	Maciej J. Drygas	Poland
2025	A Fox Under a Pink Moon	Mehrdad Oskouei	Iran

=== Best Cinematography Award International Competition ===
Year	Film	Director	Nationality of director (at time of film's release)
2021	Where Are We Headed	Ruslan Fedotow	Belarus / Russia
2022	Paradise	Paul Guilhaume	France / Switzerland
2023	Flickering Lights	Anirban Dutta & Anupama Srinivasan	India
2024	The Guest	Zvika Gregory Portnoy & Zuzanna Solakiewicz	Poland / Qatar

=== Best Directing Award International Competition ===
Year	Film	Director	Nationality of director (at time of film's release)
2021	Children of the Mist	Diem Ha Le	Vietnam
2022	Apolonia, Apolonia	Lea Glob	Denmark
2023	Life is Beautiful	Mohamed Jabaly	Norway / Palestine
2024	An American Pastoral	Auberi Edler	France

=== Best Editing Award International Competition ===
Year	Film	Director	Nationality of director (at time of film's release)
2021	Mr. Landsbergis	Danielius Kokanauskis	Lithuania / Netherlands
2022	Journey Through Our World	Mario Steenbergen	Netherlands
2023	The World Is Family	Anand Patwardhan	India
2024	Trains	Maciej J. Drygas	Poland

=== Best Film Envision Competition ===
Year	Film	Director	Nationality of director (at time of film's release)
2024	Chronicles of the Absurd	Miguel Coyula	Cuba

=== DFA Audience Award ===
Year	Film	Director	Nationality of director (at time of film's release)
1988	The Last Judgement	Herz Frank	Soviet Union
1989	Skierskala	Ivars Seleckis	Soviet Union
1990	In Memory of the Day Passed By	Šarūnas Bartas	Lithuania
1991	Djembéfola	Laurent Chevallier	France
1992	Black Harvest	Robin Anderson & Bob Connolly	Australia
1993	Belovy	V. Kossakovsky	Russia
1994	Choice and Destiny	Tsipi Reibenbach	Israel
1995	Anne Frank Remembered	Jon Blair	United Kingdom
1996	Blue Eyed	B. Verhaag	Germany
1997	Vision Man	W. Long	Sweden
1998	Twee Vaders	Ko van Reenen	Netherlands
1999	Crazy	Heddy Honigmann	Netherlands
2000	Desi	Maria Ramos	Netherlands
2001	Offspring, B	B. Stevens	Canada
2002	Bowling for Columbine	Michael Moore	United States
2003	My Flesh and Blood	Jonathan Karsh	United States
2004	The Yes Men	Dan Ollman & Sarah Price & Chris Smith	United States
2005	Sisters in Law	Kim Longinotto & Florence Ayisi	United Kingdom
2006	We Are Together / Thina simunye	Paul Taylor	United Kingdom
2007	To See If I'm Smiling	Tamar Yarom	Israel
2008	RiP: A Remix Manifesto	Brett Gaylor	Canada
2009	The Cove	Louie Psihoyos	United States
2010	Waste Land	Lucy Walker	United Kingdom / Brazil
2011	Broken Cameras	Emad Burnat & Guy Davidi	Palestine / Israel / Netherlands / France
2012	Searching for Sugar Man	Malik Bendjelloul	Sweden / United Kingdom
2013	Twin Sisters	Mona Friis Bertheussen	Norway
2014	Naziha's Spring	Gülsah Dogan	Netherlands
2015	Sonita	Rokhsareh Ghaem Maghami	Iran
2016	La Chana	Lucija Stojevic	Spain / Iceland / United States
2017	Deaf Child	Alex de Ronde	Netherlands
2018	Don't Be a Dick About It	Benjamin Mullinkosson	United States
2019	For Sama	Waad al-Kateab & Edward Watts	United Kingdom
2021	Writing with Fire	Sushmit Ghosh & Rintu Thomas	India
2022	Blue ID	Burcu Melekoglu &Vuslat Karan	Turkey
2023	20 Days in Mariupol	Mstyslav Chernov	Ukraine
2024	No Other Land	Basel Adra, Hamdan Ballal, Yuval Abraham, Rachel Szor	Palestine / Norway

=== Special Jury Prize ===
Year	Film	Director	Nationality of director (at time of film's release)
1988	Hôtel Terminus: The Life and Times of Klaus Barbie	Marcel Ophüls	France / United States
1988	The Power of Solovki	Marina Goldovskaya	Soviet Union
1989	Skierskala	Ivars Seleckis	Soviet Union
1990	The Collector	E. Strömdahl	Sweden
1991	Djembéfola	Laurent Chevallier	France
1992	Black Harvest	Robin Anderson & Bob Connolly	Australia
1993	Mit Verlust ist zu Rechnen	Ulrich Seidl	Austria
1994	Choice and Destiny	Tsipi Reibenbach	Israel
1995	Picasso Would Have Made a Glorious Waiter	Jonathan Schell	United States
1996	The Typewriter, the Rifle and the Movie Camera	Adam Simon	England
1997	Little Dieter Needs to Fly	Werner Herzog	Germany
1998	Pavel and Lyalya / a Jerusalem Romance	Viktor Kossakovsky	Russia
1999	A Cry from the Grave	Leslie Woodhead	England
2000	Keep the River on Your Right: A Modern Cannibal Tale	Laurie Gwen & David Shapiro	United States
2001	Elsewhere	Nikolaus Geyrhalter	Austria
2002	On Hitler's Highway	Lech Kowalski	France
2003	The Corporation	Mark Achbar	Canada
2004	Liberia: An Uncivil War	Jonathan Stack & James Brabazon	United States
2005	Our Daily Bread	Nikolaus Geyrhalter	Austria
2006	Tender's Heat. Wild Wild beach	Alexander Rastorguev	Russia
2007	Hold Me Tight, Let Me Go	Kim Longinotto	United Kingdom
2008	Forgetting Dad	Rick Minnich & Matthew Sweetwood	Germany / United States
2009	The Most Dangerous Man in America: Daniel Ellsberg and the Pentagon Papers	Judith Ehrlich & Rick Goldsmith	United States
2012	Teached	Kelly Amis	United States
2013	A Letter to Nelson Mandela	Khalo Matabane	South Africa / Germany
2014	Something Better to Come	Hanna Polak	Denmark / Poland
2015	Ukrainian Sheriffs	Roman Bondarchuk	Ukraine / Latvia / Germany
2016	Still Tomorrow	Jian Fan	China
2017	The Deminer	Hogir Hirori	Sweden / Iraq
2018	Los Reyes	Bettina Perut & Iván Osnovikoff	Chile / Chile

=== IDFA Award for Best Mid-Length Documentary (formerly: Silver Wolf Award) ===
Year	Film	Director	Nationality of director (at time of film's release)
1995	6 Open, 21 Closed	Amit Goren	Israel
1996	Mr. Behrmann – Leben Traum Tod	Andreas Voigt (director)	Germany
1997	Gigi, Monica...& Bianca	Yasmina Abdellaoui & Benoït Dervaux	Belgium
1998	Hephzibah	Curtis Levy	Australia
1999	Les Enfants du Borinage – Lettre à Henri Storck	Patric Jean	Belgium
2000	Jung (War) in the Land of the Mujaheddin	Fabrizio Lazzaretti, Alberto Vendemmiati, Giuseppe Petitto	Italy
2001	Haj-Abba's Wives	Mohsen Abdolvahab	Iran
2002	Interesting Times: The Secret of My Success	Jinchuan Duan	Chile
2003	Surplus: Terrorized into Being Consumers	Erik Gandini	Sweden
2004	Georgi and the butterflies	Andrey Paounov	Bulgaria
2005	Before Flying Back to the Earth	Arūnas Matelis	Lithuania
2006	Enemies of Happiness	Eva Mulvad	Denmark
2007	To See If I'm Smiling	Tamar Yarom	Israel
2008	Boris Ryzhy	Aliona van der Horst	Netherlands
2009	Iron Crows	Bong-Nam Park	South Korea
2010	People I Could Have Been And Maybe Am	Boris Gerrets	Netherlands
2011	Montenegro	Jorge Gaggero	Argentina
2012	Red Wedding	Lida Chan & Guillaume Suon	Cambodia / France
2013	Pussy Versus Putin	Gogol's Wives	Russia
2014	Kamchatka — The Cure for Hatred	Julia Mironova	Russia
2015	At Home in the World	Andreas Koefoed	Denmark
2016	Death in the Terminal	Tali Shemesh & Asaf Sudra	Israel
2017	The Dread	Martin Benchimol & Pablo Aparo	Argentina / Argentina
2018	Summa	Andrei Kutsila	Belarus
2019	Articlockwise	Jalal Vafaei	Iran
2020	The Wheel	Nomin Lkhagvasuren	Mongolia

=== IDFA Award for Best Short Documentary (formerly: Silver Cub Award) ===
Year	Film	Director	Nationality of director (at time of film's release)
2005	Butterfly Man	Samantha Rebillet	Australia
2006	My Eyes	Erlend E. Mo	Denmark
2007	The Tailor	Oscar Pérez	Spain
2008	Slaves – An animated documentary	Hanna Heilborn & David Aronowitsch	Sweden / Denmark
2009	Six Weeks	Marcin Janos Krawczyk	Poland
2017	Vi bara lyder (we merely obey)	Erik Holmström och Fredrik Wenzel	Sweden
2018	I Signed the Petition	Mahdi Fleifel	Denmark
2019	Up at Night	Nelson Makengo	Republic of the Congo
2020	Unforgivable	Marlén Viñayo	El Salvador
2021	Handbook	Pavel Mozhar	Germany / Belarus
2022	Away	Ruslan Fedotow	Russia

=== IDFA Award for Best First Appearance ===
Year	Film	Director	Nationality of director (at time of film's release)
1997	Anthem, an American Road Story	Shainee Gabel & Kristin Hahn	United States
1998	Les Amoureux de Dieu / Howling for God	Dan Alexe	Belgium
1999	Zwischen 2 Welten	Bettina Haasen	Germany
2000	Hybrid	Monteith McCollum	United States
2001	Suka	Igor Voloshin	Russia
2002	Barbeiros	M. Junkkonen	Finland
2003	My Flesh and Blood	Jonathan Karsh	United States
2003	The Very Best Day	Pavel Medvedev	Russia
2004	Podul Peste Tisa	Ileana Stanculescu	Romania
2005	The Angelmakers	Astrid Bussink	Netherlands / Scotland
2006	We Are Together / Thina simunye	Paul Taylor	United Kingdom
2007	End of the Rainbow	Robert Nugent	France / Australia
2008	Constantin and Elena	Andrei Dascalescu	Romania
2009	Colony	Ross McDonnell & Carter Gunn	Ireland / United States
2010	Kano: An American and His Harem	Monster Jimenez	Philippines
2011	The Vanishing Spring Light	Xun Yu	China / Canada
2012	Soldier on the Roof	Esther Hertog	Netherlands
2013	My Name Is Salt	Farida Pacha	Switzerland / India
2014	Drifter	Gábor Hörcher	Hungary / Germany
2015	When the Earth Seems to Be Light	Salome Machaidze & Tamuna Karumidze & David Meskhi	Georgia
2016	Who We Were	Sine Skibsholt	Denmark
2017	The Distant Barking of Dogs	Simon Lereng Wilmont	Denmark
2018	Giacinto Scelsi. The First Motion of the Immovable	Sebastiano d'Ayala Valva	France
2019	Solidarity	Lucy Parker	United Kingdom
2020	This Rain Will Never Stop	Alina Gorlova	Ukraine

=== Movies that Matter Human Rights Award ===
Year	Film	Director	Nationality of director (at time of film's release)
2002	The Day I Will Never Forget	Kim Longinotto	United Kingdom
2002	The Trials of Henry Kissinger	Eugene Jarecki	United States / United Kingdom / Chile
2003	Aileen: Life and Death of a Serial Killer	Nick Broomsfield & Joan Churchill	United Kingdom
2004	The 3 Rooms of Melancholia	Pirjo Honkasalo	Finland
2005	China Blue	Micha X Peled	United States
2006	New Year Baby	Socheata Poeuv	United States
2007	Jerusalem Is Proud to Present	Nitzan Gilady	Israel
2008	Burma VJ: Reporting from a Closed Country	Anders Østergaard	Denmark

=== IDFA DOC U! Award for the youth jury's favorite film (formerly: Moviesquad DOC U! Award) ===
Year	Film	Director	Nationality of director (at time of film's release)
2005	Shadya, Roy	Roy Westler	Israel
2006	A Lesson of Belarusian	Miroslaw Dembinski	Poland
2007	Planet B-Boy	Benson Lee	United States
2008	Kassim the Dream	Kief Davidson	United States
2009	The Yes Men Fix the World	Andy Bichlbaum & Mike Bonanno	France / United States
2010	Autumn Gold	Jan Tenhaven	Germany
2011	The Last Days of Winter	Mehrdad Oskouei	Iran
2012	Little World	Marcel Barrena	Spain
2013	#chicagoGirl – The Social Network Takes on a Dictator	Joe Piscatella	United States / Syria

=== IDFA Award for Best Student Documentary ===
Year	Film	Director	Nationality of director (at time of film's release)
2007	Paradise – Three Journeys in This World	Elina Hirvonen	Finland
2008	Shakespeare and Victor Hugo's Intimacies	Yulene Olaizola	Mexico
2009	Redemption	Sabrina Wulff	Germany
2015	My Aleppo	Melissa Langer	United States

=== IDFA DocLab Competition for Immersive Non-Fiction ===

The IDFA DocLab Competition for Immersive Non-Fiction rewards the best immersive non-fiction of the festival.

Year	Work	Artist(s)	Nationality of artist (at time of work release)
2021	Museum of Austerity	Sacha Wares, John Pring	United Kingdom
2022	In Pursuit of Repetitive Beats	Darren Emerson	United Kingdom
2023	Turbulence Jamais Vu	Ben Joseph Andrews, Emma Roberts	Australia
2024	Me, a Depiction	Lisa Schamlé	Netherlands

==== Special Jury Award for Creative Technology ====
Year	Work	Artist(s)	Nationality of artist (at time of work release)
2021	Symbiosis	Marcel van Brakel, Mark Meeuwenoord,	Netherlands
2022	Plastisapiens	Miri Chekhanovic, Edith Jorisch	Canada / Israel
2023	Natalie's Trifecta	Natalie Paneng	South Africa
2024	The Liminal	Alaa Al Minawi	Netherlands / Lebanon / Palestine

=== IDFA DocLab Competition for Digital Storytelling ===
The IDFA DocLab Competition for Digital Storytelling rewards the best Digital Storytelling.

==== Award-winning works ====
Year	Film	Director	Nationality of director (at time of film or website's release)
2010	Out My Window	Katerina Cizek	Canada
2011	In Situ	Antoine Viviani	France
2018	1 the Road	Ross Goodwin	United States
2019	The Waiting Room VR	Victoria Mapplebeck	United Kingdom
2021	Un(re)solved	Tamara Shogaolu	United States
2022	He Fucked the Girl Out of Me	Taylor McCue	United States
2023	Anouschka	Tamara Shogaolu	The Netherlands, United-States, Switzerland

=== Zapper Award (1994–1996) ===
Year	Film	Director	Nationality of director (at time of film's release)
1994	Death of a Nation: The Timor Conspiracy	David Munro	England
1995	My Vote is My Secret Chroniques Sud Africaines 1994	Julie Henderson & Thulani Mokoena & Donne Rundle	France
1996	Grenzeloze Liefde – Made in Japan	Puck de Leeuw	Netherlands

== Sources ==
- De Valk, Marijke (2010). "'And the winner is …'What happens behind the scenes of film festival competitions". International Journal of Cultural Studies. 13 (3): 290–307. doi:10.1177/1367877909359735.
- Vallejo Vallejo, Aida (2020). "IDFA's Industry Model: Fostering Global Documentary Production and Distribution". Documentary Film Festivals. 2: 22–53.
