= Unforgivable =

Unforgivable may refer to:

- Unforgivable (1996 film), an American television drama film
- Unforgivable (2011 film), the English title of French drama film Impardonnables
- Unforgivable (2020 film), an El Salvador short documentary film
- Unforgivable (2025 film), a BBC TV film
- The Unforgivable, a 2021 American-German drama film
- Unforgivable (TV series), a 2024 Singaporean crime drama series
- Unforgivable sins
- "Unforgivable" (song), a 2009 song by Armin van Buuren featuring Jaren
- Unforgivable (video series), a 2006 American Youtube comedy video
