= This Rain Will Never Stop =

2020 Ukrainian documentary film

- Official poster
- Ukrainian: Цей дощ ніколи не скінчиться
- Directed by: Alina Gorlova
- Story by: Alina Gorlova; Maksym Nakonechnyi
- Produced by: Maksym Nakonechnyi; Ilona Bicevska; Patrick Hamm; Lena Yakovitska
- Cinematography: Vyacheslav Tsvetkov
- Edited by: Simon Mozgovyi; Olha Zhurba
- Music by: Goran Gora; Serge Synthkey
- Distributed by: Square Eyes
- Release date: 19 November 2020 (IDFA)
- Running time: 1 hr. 42 min.
- Countries: Ukraine, Latvia, Germany, Qatar
- Language: Ukrainian
- Budget: ₴6.5 million

This Rain Will Never Stop (Ukrainian: Цей дощ ніколи не скінчиться) is a documentary film by Ukrainian director Alina Gorlova with cinematography by Vyacheslav Tsvetkov. It is a Ukrainian-Latvian-German-Qatari production, produced by Maksym Nakonechnyi for Tabor Production. The film follows a Kurdish-Ukrainian Red Cross worker who delivers aid in the Russo-Ukrainian War and tries to help reconnect with his family which had scattered from the Syrian Civil War.

The film is known for its powerful story, rich black-and-white cinematography, and expressionist art house style. It was recognized at the 2020 International Documentary Film Festival Amsterdam winning the IDFA Award for Best First Appearance and has won the grand prize at several other international film festivals. It has been scheduled for commercial release in spring 2022.

The film is divided into 11 sections that are notated with the numbers 0 thru 9 and back to 0 in Arabic. This method was used to show the cycles of "war, peace, destroying, rebuilding, life and death".

== Synopsis ==
The film introduces the Donbas region of southeastern Ukraine through aerial shots and alternating scenes of military and civilian activities. Among the crowd scenes, it gradually focuses on 20-year-old Kurdish-Ukrainian Andriy Suleyman, student worker for the Red Cross. At a celebration honoring the organization's work in Ukraine, Suleyman shares his personal story on how he came to work for the organization. Having just completed elementary school, his family fled their home in Syria during the Syrian Civil War to resettle in Lysychansk, Luhansk region, Ukraine, the hometown of his mother. With the eruption of the Russo-Ukrainian War, Suleyman again found himself in a war zone and set aside his personal ambitions to help deliver humanitarian aid.

The film runs the storyline of Suleyman's family and his humanitarian work on the ground in parallel to each other. While in Germany for his brother's wedding, his parents urge him to seize the opportunity to migrate to the stability of Western Europe, but his personality forces him to continue his humanitarian work for those most in need. Suleyman has a heartfelt meeting with the family of his uncle Koshnhav who treats wounded people in Iraqi Kurdistan, and Suleyman tries to cross the border into Syria but is prevented by the war. After the unexpected death of his father Lazgin, Suleyman tries to honour his wishes by bringing his body to Syria for burial but again faces obstacles. If he crosses into Syria, there is a likelihood that he will be conscripted and forced to fight.

== Development ==
Director Alina Gorlova planned to film in the disputed territory of Donbas as it came to notice globally in March 2014 due to the conflict between Russia and Ukraine. A friend introduced her to Andriy Suleyman, who had escaped one war to find himself in another. After some consideration, she realized that Suleyman's perspective was even better than a Donbas native's, which she had originally sought. She was interested in how each of Suleyman's homelands were at war and that he had chosen to work with the Red Cross, as if "trapped by war". She also felt that the "cold and shy" nature of Suleyman worked for the film, causing audiences to focus on his surroundings.

Originally envisioned as a short, character-driven documentary, Gorlova realized during filming that it could be greatly expanded to convey a broad message about war beyond the conflicts in Syria and Ukraine. While living among the people of the war-torn region, she also sought to convey the empathy she felt for them. After talks with DocuDays UA International Human Rights Documentary Film Festival, Gorlova developed the project into a full feature. (Note: Gorlova's previous feature film, No Obvious Signs, received the grand prize and three other awards at DocuDays UA 2018.)

Periods of filming followed Suleyman on humanitarian missions and visits to family members in Germany and Kurdish Iraq. Gorlova kept the narrative politically neutral, believing that this followed naturally from the neutrality of the Red Cross and wishing to avoid a judgemental tone while exploring the desires of people living in war zones.

The film was developed under the working title Between Two Wars. The name changed several times during filming, as the family's story unfolded. Its release title, This Rain Will Never Stop, refers to the rains which flooded an international bridge, damming it with garbage and submerging it, which blocked Suleyman from crossing into Syria to visit family. This alludes to the needless obstacles individuals face from the overwhelming detritus of war.

== Production ==
The film is a Ukrainian-Latvian-German- Dutch (IFFA)-Qatari co-production. It received ₴2.2 million of its ₴6.5 million budget from the State Cinema of Ukraine, with additional funding from the Latvian Film Centre, the IDFA Bertha Fund and the Doha Film Institute. Production was by Maksym Nakonechnyi for Tabor Production (Ukraine), co-produced by Ilona Bičevska for Avantis Promo (Latvia) and Patrick Hamm for Bulldog Agenda (Germany).

I like to work with the viewer's subconscious, and that's why I was trying to create several symbols like a bridge, like water, fire, also I was working with black and white, which means opposite sides, like war and peace, life and death.

— Alina Gorlova

The film was shot entirely in black-and-white, which is how Gorlov first remembered seeing the Donbas region with its "slag heaps in industrial landscapes". She also chose this to help draw parallels between Donbas and Syria. Director of photography Viacheslav Tsvietkov shared this aesthetic, which he had used in his previous projects.

The most difficult technical and ethical scene was Lazgin's funeral, which Gorlova filmed with a Syrian camera crew, without the aid of Tsvietkov or direct sound. She had convinced Suleyman family elder Mezgin to allow the filming as a way of bringing the family together, since they were unable to physically reunite.

The score was composed by Goran Gora (instrumentals) and Serge Synthkey (electronic), with sound design by Vasyl Yavtushenko. Editing is by Simon Mozgovyi and Olha Zhurba. The film's dialog is in Ukrainian, Kurdish, Russian, Arabic and German.

== Themes ==
A strong theme of the film is the displacement and isolation brought by war. It is told in unconnected chapters, broken by visuals of peoples and desolate vistas, from which the narrative emerges piecemeal. Mesmerizing wide shots alternate with rapid, turbulent editing to evoke the tense and uneasy atmosphere of the setting. Jessica Kiang of Variety found that this approach, enhanced by the bleak black-and-white cinematography and bare electronic music, was essential to Gorlova's telling of an "ambitious chaos theory of war". Gorlova uses broken connections as a metaphor for the Koran's expression of limbo, Barzakh (literally "obstacle" or "barrier").

Other commentators discussed the continuous cycles of war and peace. People in the film cope with gunfire by normalizing it through casual complaints and seize brief moments of happiness at all costs. The film frequently juxtaposes images of military machinery with humanitarian and cultural activities, destruction with reconstruction, life and death. Flowing water is used as a metaphor throughout the film. Cinematic expressionism techniques reinforce the sense of losing control as Suleyman is swept along by the currents of war and peace. Structurally, the film's chapters are titled 0 through 9 then return to 0 for the epilogue.

== Release ==
This Rain Will Never Stop had its world premiere on 19 November 2020 at the International Documentary Film Festival Amsterdam (IDFA). The film has been screened at twenty film festivals, (Note: The festival tour was largely virtual, due to the ongoing COVID-19 pandemic.) receiving the grand prize at seven of these.

The Ukrainian Institute supported its international promotion. Following its premiere, international distribution rights for the film were acquired by Square Eyes. The film's commercial release has been scheduled for spring 2022.

== Reception ==
=== Critical response ===
The film was widely praised at film festivals. The IDFA jury called the film "a powerful story that does not allow us to escape from the destruction and heart-wrenching losses of wars". The GoEast jury praised Gorlov's brave and empathetic vision. Writing for the ACT Human Rights Film Festival, David Scott Diffrient distinguished This Rain Will Never Stop from other refugee-crisis films by its rich art house cinematography with "carefully composed shots, monochromatic lyricism, and oblique structure" prompting deep contemplation by audiences.

Critics also found the film impressive but were cautious in recommending it to general audiences. Kiang praised the film as "a brave and uncompromisingly artistic attempt to outline [...] the psychological and philosophical displacement [of war]", while noting that some viewers might be dissatisfied by the lack of political commentary. Marko Stojiljković of Ubiquarian felt that audiences might be lost by the disjoined narrative, which was most appreciated by the festival juries and cinephiles who could appreciate its techniques.

=== Awards ===
This Rain Will Never Stop won the IDFA Award for Best First Appearance and received the grand prize at seven other festivals: Festival dei popoli, Las Palmas IFF, GoEast, Ethnocineca, One World, Iceland Documentary Film Festival, and Belgrade International Documentary Film Festival (Beldocs). It also won Best Documentary at the Ukrainian Film Critics Awards.

List of awards
Year	Institution (Country)	Category	Nominee or recipient	Result	Ref
2019	European Women's Audiovisual Network (Note: The EWA Female Talent Award was announced at DOK Leipzig documentary film festival, Germany.)	Female Talent Award	Alina Gorlova – Between Two Wars	Won	
2020	International Documentary Film Festival Amsterdam (IDFA) (The Netherlands)	Best Feature Film – First Appearance	This Rain Will Never Stop	Won	
2020	Festival dei popoli (Italy)	Best Feature Film	This Rain Will Never Stop	Won	
2021	DocuDays UA (Ukraine)	Special Award	This Rain Will Never Stop	Selected	
2021	Las Palmas IFF (Spain)	Best Feature Film	This Rain Will Never Stop	Won	
2021	Ethnocineca (Austria)	Best International Documentary	This Rain Will Never Stop	Won	
2021	GoEast (Germany)	Golden Lily for Best Film	This Rain Will Never Stop	Won	
2021	One World Film Festival (Czech Republic)	Best Film	This Rain Will Never Stop	Won	
2021	Iceland Documentary Film Festival	Best Film	This Rain Will Never Stop	Won	
2021	Belgrade International Documentary Film Festival (Beldocs) (Serbia)	Best Film (International)	This Rain Will Never Stop	Won	
2021	Black Canvas Contemporary Film Festival (Mexico)	Best Cinematography	This Rain Will Never Stop	Won	
2021	El Gouna Film Festival (Egypt)	Special Mention	This Rain Will Never Stop	Selected	
2021	Ukrainian Film Critics Awards	Best Documentary	This Rain Will Never Stop	Won	
2021	Cork International Film Festival (Ireland)	Cinematic Documentary	This Rain Will Never Stop	Won	
2021	DOK.fest München (Germany)	Audience Award	This Rain Will Never Stop	Nominated	
2022	Millennium Docs Against Gravity (Poland)	Best Cinematography	This Rain Will Never Stop	Won	
