= The Secret of My Success =

The Secret of My Success may refer to:

- The Secret of My Success (1965 film)
- The Secret of My Success (1987 film)
- "The Secret of My Success" (song), 1987 release by Night Ranger and theme for the film
- The Secret of My Success (musical), a musical comedy play based on the 1987 movie
- Interesting Times: The Secret of My Success, a 2002 documentary film
