= Ziba Mir-Hosseini =

Iranian legal anthropologist

Ziba Mir-Hosseini (Persian: زیبا میرحسینی; born 3 April 1952) is an Iranian-born legal anthropologist, specialising in Islamic law, gender and development. She received her PhD in anthropology from Cambridge University and is the author of several books on Islam, gender, and the family.

She has also directed two documentary films, Runaway and Divorce Iranian Style.

== Biography ==
Born to Iranian parents, Mir-Hosseini is fluent in English, French, and Persian, and is familiar with Arabic and Kurdish. She received her bachelor's degree in Sociology from Tehran University in 1974, and completed her PhD in Social anthropology in 1980 from the University of Cambridge. Mir-Hosseini's doctoral thesis was written about an ethnographic fieldwork in 1977 in Kalardasht, a tourist district in Iran, about how tourism and a changing economy both impacted traditional Iranian family life, and is titled "Changing Aspects of Economic and Family Structures in Kalardasht, a District of Northern Iran." Mir-Hosseini specialises in Islamic law, gender, and development and is a member of the Council of Women Living under Muslim Laws.

"Women want the same things that everyone wants. They want love, they want happiness, they want to be able to work, to be out in the world. And what's happening is, as more of these women are educating themselves, the sheer groundswell of it coming from below is forcing a change. So it's not a question of the government making concessions to these women – it's women forcing concessions from below."
– Ziba Mir-Hosseini

Mir-Hosseini is an expert on Iranian affairs, Islamic family law, and women in the Muslim world. She frequents radio and TV programs all over the world, has been studied on many TV documentaries on Iran, participates in panel discussions and projects in the US, UK and other countries and has published various works.

In 2000, Mir-Hosseini was a jury member of San Francisco International Film Festival and became a jury member for International Human Rights Documentary Film Festival. In 2003, Mir-Hosseini became a jury member of Amnesty International DOEN Award for the best film on human rights, International Documentary Film Festival Amsterdam (IDFA). In 2015, she received the Martin E. Marty Award for the Public Understanding of Religion.
