= Interesting Times (disambiguation) =

Interesting Times is a 1994 novel by Terry Pratchett.

Interesting Times may also refer to:

- Interesting Times (album), a 1989 album by High Tide
- Interesting Times: The Secret of My Success, a 2002 Chinese documentary film
- Interesting Times, a podcast by New York Times columnist Ross Douthat

== See also ==
- "May you live in interesting times", an English expression, purportedly a translation of a Chinese curse
