= Fragments of Ice =

- Directed by: Maria Stoianova
- Written by: Maria Stoianova
- Produced by: Maksym Nakonechnyi; Alina Gorlova
- Cinematography: Mykhailo Stoianov
- Edited by: Viktor Onýsko; Maryna Maikovska
- Music by: Andrii Dehtiariov
- Production companies: TABOR production Indie Film
- Distributed by: Arthouse Traffic
- Release dates: 13 April 2024 (Visions du Réel); 26 September 2024 (Ukraine)
- Running time: 95 minutes
- Countries: Ukraine; Norway
- Languages: Ukrainian; Russian; English

Fragments of Ice (Ukrainian: Фрагменти льоду) is a 2024 Ukrainian–Norwegian documentary film directed by Maria Stoianova. The film is dedicated to film editor Viktor Onysko, who was killed in 2022 during the Russo-Ukrainian war and did not live to complete work on the film. The film received several awards at the 21st Docudays UA International Human Rights Documentary Film Festival. The theatrical release in Ukraine is scheduled for 26 September 2024.

== Synopsis ==
The film is an essay documentary assembled from fragments of the unique family video archives of a figure skater from the Ukrainian ice ballet ensemble. His daughter, director Maria Stoianova, revisits recordings of her father’s foreign tours from the 1980s and 1990s, mixed with home movies, and shows the contrast between the idealised image of the West and the bleak Soviet reality. Through the prism of personal stories, the historical breaks of the collapse of the USSR and the restoration of Ukraine’s independence acquire new shades in this restrained exploration of resilience, identity and hope that continues into the present day.

== Production ==
=== Development and editing ===
Work on Fragments of Ice began in 2021. Stoianova set out to explore the “vision of paradise” that her parents and other residents of the Soviet Union had about the “Western world”, and how this vision changed along with the evolution of the socio‑political landscape.

By the start of the full‑scale Russian invasion in February 2022 the film was only half edited, and work on it stopped after editor Viktor Onysko was killed in December 2022. Editing was completed by Maryna Maikovska in 2023, and the finished film is dedicated to Onysko’s memory. The film was produced by TABOR production and Indie Film with Ukrainian and Norwegian participation.

== Crew ==
- Director: Maria Stoianova
- Writer: Maria Stoianova
- Composer: Andrii Dehtiariov
- Sound designer: Vasyl Yavtushenko
- Editors: Viktor Onysko, Maryna Maikovska
- Cinematography: Mykhailo Stoianov
- Producers: Maksym Nakonechnyi, Alina Gorlova

== Release ==
=== Festival premiere ===
The film had its world premiere on 13 April 2024 at the Swiss documentary film festival Visions du Réel in Nyon. A Ukrainian theatrical release is planned for 26 September 2024, with distribution handled by Arthouse Traffic.

== Awards ==
At the 21st Docudays UA International Human Rights Documentary Film Festival, Fragments of Ice received several awards:

- Critics’ Jury Award (International Competition)
- Students’ Jury Prize (main prize)
- Special Mention in the Docu/World competition
- Main award in the Docu/Ukraine competition
