= The Last Days of Winter =

The Last Days of Winter may refer to:

- The Last Days of Winter (film), a 2011 Iranian documentary
- The Last Days of Winter (TV series), an Iranian documentary television series
