= Las Palmas de Gran Canaria International Film Festival =

Film festival in Las Palmas, Gran Canaria, Spain

The Las Palmas de Gran Canaria International Film Festival (Spanish: Festival Internacional de Cine de Las Palmas de Gran Canaria) is an international film festival that is held in Las Palmas on the island of Gran Canaria in the Canary Islands. The festival takes place every year. It was first held in 2000.

The festival is held in several venues in the city. In 2015 the Palacete Rodriguez Quegles frequently became the base for the festival.

== Winners of the Lady Harimaguada de Oro ==
Year	Title	Director(s)
2000	Gloomy Sunday	Rolf Schübel
2001	Innocence	Paul Cox
2002	The Man Who Wasn't There	Joel Coen
2003	Mr. and Mrs. Iyer	Aparna Sen
2004	Spring, Summer, Fall, Winter... and Spring	Kim Ki-duk
2005	The World	Jia Zhangke
2006	The Blossoming of Maximo Oliveros	Auraeus Solito
2007	Fireworks Wednesday	Asghar Farhadi
2008	Drifter	Cao Guimaraes
2009	Prince of Broadway	Sean Baker
2010	Godmother	Brillante Mendoza
2011	Jean Gentil	Laura Amelia Guzmán, Israel Cárdenas
2012	The Loneliest Planet	Julia Loktev
2014	Educação Sentimental	Júlio Bressane
2015	The Creation of Meaning	Simone Rapisarda Casanova
2016	Kaili Blues	Bi Gan
2017	Bitter Money	Wang Bing
2018	The Green Fog	Guy Maddin
2019	The Portuguese Woman	Rita Azevedo Gomes
2020	–	
2021	This Rain Will Never Stop	Alina Gorlova
2022	Memoryland	Kim Quy Bui
2023	Bad Living	João Canijo
2024	Matt and Mara	Kazik Radwanski
2025	Seeds	Brittany Shyne
2026	Everything Else Is Noise (Lo demás es ruido)	Nicolás Pereda
