= Alaa Minawi =

Palestinian and Dutch interdisciplinary artist and lecturer

- Born: 1982 (age 43–44); Beirut, Lebanon
- Education: Lebanese American University, Beirut
- Known for: Luminal art, theater
- Notable work: My Light is Your Light... (2014); The Liminal (2025)
- Website: alaaminawi.com

Alaa Minawi (born 1982, in Beirut) is a Lebanese, Palestinian and Dutch interdisciplinary artist and lecturer based in Amsterdam. His work ranges between performing arts and installations, often merging the two practices, and explores themes such as belonging, conflict and healing, and Arab-futurism.

== Education and career ==
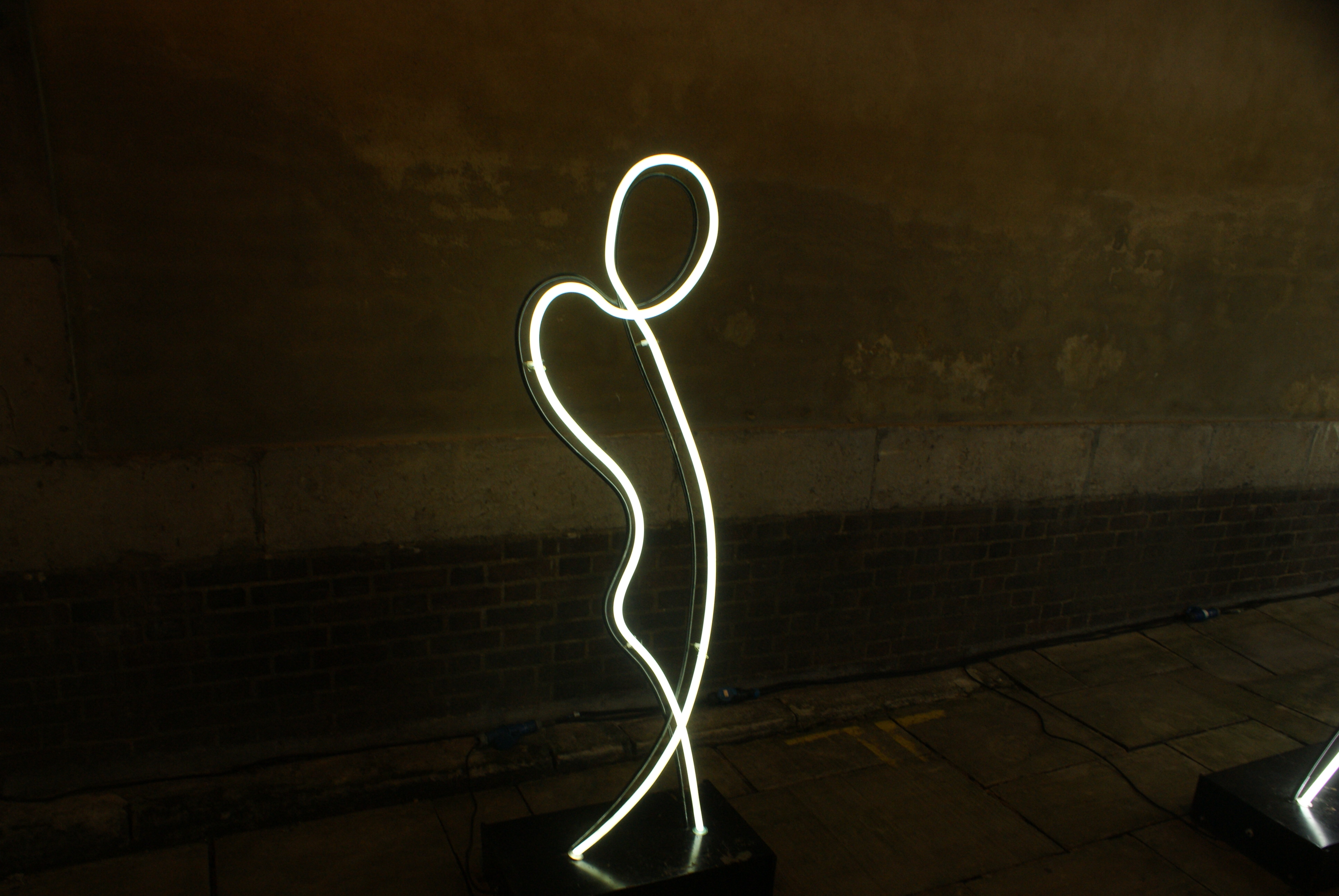
Detail shot of Minawi's My Light is Your Light.. in the churchyard of St. James's Church, Piccadilly (2018)

Minawi graduated with a Bachelor of Arts in Communication from the Lebanese American University in 2008, and earned a MA in Fine Arts from Hogeschool voor de Kunsten Utrecht in 2018. He went on to study lighting design lighting design at the Royal Academy of Dramatic Arts in London.

Minawi began his career in 2006 as a lighting designer and scenographer, collaborating with various theater and dance companies in Lebanon and the Arab region. In 2010, he began creating his own installations, which have been frequently exhibited in public spaces. Some of his notable works include Beyond Myself... (2013), My Light is Your Light... (2014), The Bride (2016), Waiting for It to End... (2020), and The Liminal (2024). In 2016, Minawi began an artistic research project focused on the concept of belonging and its connection to physical space, culminating in a series of performances collectively titled 2048. In this work, Minawi aimed to integrate installation and performance art, involving the audience as a part of his performance.

Minawi is a teacher at the Amsterdam University of the Arts (AHK) and the Hogeschool voor de Kunsten Utrecht (HKU), and is a lecturer at the Sandberg Institute in Amsterdam. He is the founder and program director of the Beirut Summer School for Theater and Performance.

== Awards and nominations ==
Minawi's installation My Light is Your Light... was selected for UNESCO's International Year of Light 2015 and was nominated for the Best Light Art Award at the D’Arc Awards, London, UK in 2016. In 2024, Minawi's work-in-progress installation The Liminal received a Special Jury Award in International Documentary Film Festival Amsterdam's immersive non-fiction competition; it premiered in 2025 and was nominated for the Best Dutch Director Award in the Digital Storytelling category at the Dutch Directors Guild Awards.

== Selected works ==
=== Installations ===
- 2013 - Beyond myself...
- 2014 - My light is your light...
- 2016 - The Bride
- 2020 - Waiting for it to end...
- 2022 - Cobie's light
- 2022 - Figure no. 7
- 2023 - Out-of-body experience

=== Performances ===
- 2012 - A piano in my pillow
- 2018 - 2048 – The machine
- 2019 - 2048 – Bodies – Borders – Belonging
- 2019 - 2048 – What does not make us one
- 2021 - That breath we held...
- 2023 - 2048 – Identity in Dissolution
- 2025 - The Liminal
