= Guillaume Suon =

French-Cambodian filmmaker (born 1982)

- Born: 26 November 1982 (age 43)
- Occupation: Film director
- Notable work: Red Wedding; The Storm Makers

Guillaume Suon (born 26 November 1982) is a French-Cambodian filmmaker.

== Career ==
Guillaume Suon has focused his first documentary films on Cambodia’s history and contemporary society.

Trained by the Oscar-nominated filmmaker Rithy Panh, Guillaume Suon is an alumnus of the Berlinale Talent Campus and a fellow of the Sundance Institute and the IDFAcademy.

== Filmography ==
| Year | Film | Genre | Awards |
|---|---|---|---|
| 2010 | About My Father | Documentary | Runner Up at the AIBD World TV Awards 2011 Jury Award at the FEMI 2012 Special Jury Award at the Festival Internacional de Cine Político (FICIP) 2013 |
| 2012 | Red Wedding | Documentary | Award for Best Mid-Length Documentary at the International Documentary Film Festival Amsterdam (IDFA) 2012 Aljazeera Golden Award at the Aljazeera International Documentary Film Festival 2013 (Qatar) Jury Prize at the Gdansk DocFilm Festival 2013 (Poland) Special Jury Prize at the Human Rights Human Dignity International Film Festival 2013 Best South East Asian Human Rights Film at the FreedomFilmFest 2013 (Kuala Lumpur, Malaysia) Special Mention Award at the Salaya International Documentary Film Festival 2014 (Thailand) |
| 2013 | The Last Refuge | Documentary | Aung San Suu Kyi Award for ASEAN Films at the Human Rights Human Dignity International Film Festival (HRHDIFF) 2014 (Yangon, Myanmar) Best SEA Documentary Award at the Freedom Film Fest 2014 (Kuala Lumpur, Malaysia) |
| 2014 | The Storm Makers | Documentary | Mecenat Award for Best Asian Documentary Film at the Busan International Film Festival (BIFF) 2014 (South Korea) Inspiration Award at the Full Frame Documentary Film Festival 2015 (Durham, U.S.A.) “Windows on the World” Prize for the Best Feature Film at Milan's Festival of African, Asian and Latin American Cinema 2015 Special Mention Award at the Salaya International Documentary Film Festival 2015 (Thailand) |
| 2019 | The Taste of Secrets | Documentary | Allocine |
