= The Creation of Meaning =

- Film poster
- La creazione di significato
- Directed by: Simone Rapisarda Casanova
- Starring: Pacifico Pieruccioni, Alexander Auf Der Heyde, Siria Battelli, Bartolomeo Puccetti, Cinzia Bertuccelli, Maria Paola Casanova, Francesco Marchetti, Andrea Taccetti, Diego Bonuccelli, Marco Bonuccelli, Robert Walter Colombini, Marco Bondielli, Daniele Eschini, Alessandro Elmi, Massimiliano Pisano
- Release date: August 2014 (Locarno)
- Running time: 90 minutes
- Countries: Italy; Canada
- Language: Italian

The Creation of Meaning (Italian: La creazione di significato) is a 2014 experimental film directed by Simone Rapisarda Casanova.

== Plot ==
An elderly shepherd, Pacifico Pieruccioni, is forced by the economic crisis to give up his house and land in the Italian mountains, where his parents had fought in the Resistance against the German Army during World War II. Oddly enough, the prospective buyer is a young German. The two of them start a conversation about history and present-day Italy.

== Production ==
The Creation of Meaning is the second feature film by Simone Rapisarda Casanova. It is set and shot in the Apuan Alps, the landscape once crossed by the Gothic Line. The film is an experimental hybrid fiction-documentary inspired by Jorge Luis Borges's short story The Aleph. Rapisarda Casanova's stylistic hallmarks include his elliptical, metacinematic approach to storytelling, his unconventional use of non-actors, his use of natural light and colour inspired by renaissance paintings, along with meticulously composed static single-takes and diegetic soundscapes. His approach to filmmaking is mostly process-driven, after careful research of the thematic base. The intent behind such stylistic and methodological choices is to create a cinematic occasion where people and places may reveal their deepest nature.

== Release and critical response ==
The Creation of Meaning won the Best Emerging Director award at the Locarno Film Festival in 2014; in 2015 it won the Best of Festival award at the Ann Arbor Film Festival and was acquired and released theatrically by the Museum of Modern Art, New York and by the National Gallery of Art, Washington DC. The film has a 100% Fresh rating on Rotten Tomatoes.

=== Awards ===
2014

- Best Emerging Director award, Locarno Film Festival, Switzerland

2015

- Best of Festival award, Ann Arbor Film Festival, MI, USA
- Best Film award, Las Palmas de Gran Canaria International Film Festival, Spain
- Best Documentary award, Yerevan International Film Festival, Armenia

=== Collections ===
- Museum of Modern Art, New York, NY, USA
- National Gallery of Art, Washington DC, USA

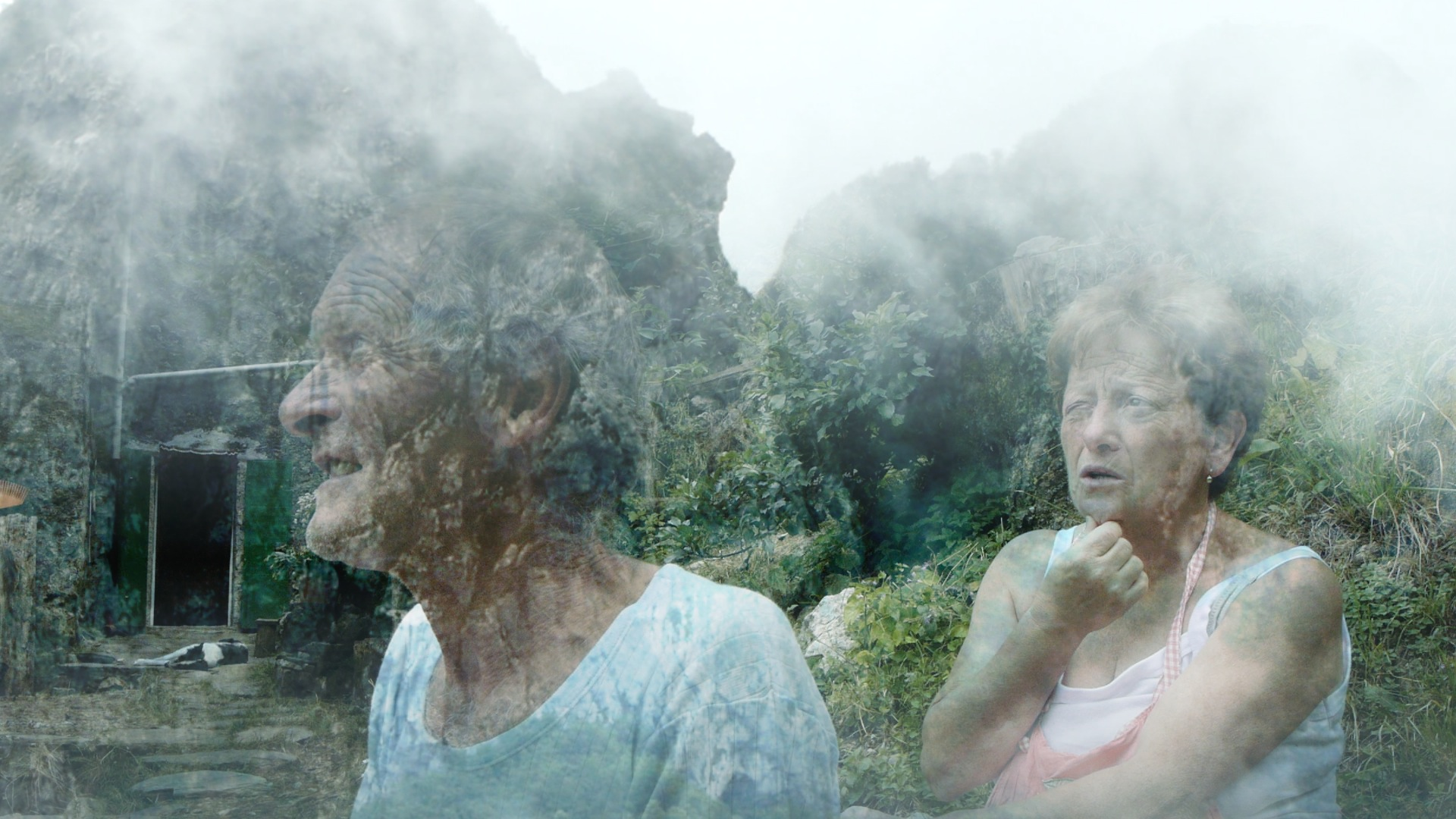
A frame from "The Creation of Meaning"
