= Zwischen 2 Welten =

Zwischen zwei Welten
- Directed by: Bettina Haasen
- Production company: Ma.ja.de. Filmproduktion in co-production with Cauri Films
- Release date: 1999
- Running time: 52min
- Country: Germany
- Language: German

Between two worlds (original title: Zwischen zwei Welten) is a 1999 documentary film by director Bettina Haasen. The film focuses on the conversations between director Haasen and members of the nomadic Woodabe tribe in Nigeria. The documentary has an ethnographical approach.

== Awards ==
- IDFA Award for best First Appearance (1999)
- FIPRESCI Prize (1999)
