= Mehrdad Oskouei =

Mehrdad Oskouei مهرداد اسکویی
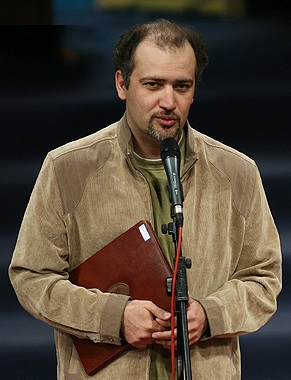

Personal details
- Born: 12 September 1969 (age 57) Tehran, Iran
- Occupation: Film director, screenwriter, producer, and photographer

Mehrdad Oskouei (Persian: مهرداد اسکویی; born in Tehran, Iran in 1969) is an Iranian independent film producer, film director, screenwriter of documentary films and film educator.

== Career ==
Oskouei has been described as "Iran's foremost documentary filmmaker." He holds an MFA in film directing from the Department of Film and Theater of Tehran University of Fine Arts. Most of his films have been shown at prestigious festivals both national and international with many receiving critical acclaim. His films being shown at over 500 national and international film festivals in over 70 countries and having won over 145 awards makes him one of the most outstanding Iranian documentary makers. In 2010, Oskouei received the Prince Claus Award from the Netherlands for his achievements.

Oskouei has attended various international film festival studies programs including The Berlinale Talent Campus, The German Academy of Fine Arts, The International Documentary Film Festival Amsterdam Academy (IDFAcademy) as well as film workshop in France, England, Poland, Switzerland, the UAE and (Germany) under such esteemed filmmakers as: Albert Maysles, Richard Leacock, Abbas Kiarostami, Frederick Wiseman, Ross McElwee, Werner Herzog, Wim Wenders, Anthony Minghella, Michel Chion, Amir Naderi, and Walter Murch. The Visual Heritage Center of Iran was founded in 2011 by Oskouei along with the cooperation of researchers in various fields. The heritage's activities are centered on historical photographs and post cards of Iran.

In 2010, Oskouei received the lifetime achievement in documentary making from the Iranian Documentary Filmmakers Association at the House of Cinema awards ceremony. In January 2015, The Gilan province Islamic Cultural Center awarded him for his archival research and pictorial history of their province. Oskouei directed the Iranian Cultural Special Documentary Committee from 2004 until 2008. His film The Last Days of Winter was screened in France in 2013 and his latest film "Starless Dreams" was screened in France, England, Switzerland, the United States, and Japan in 2017 and 2018. He was a founding member of the Institute of Anthropology and Culture, where he interviewed many prominent Iranian and foreign filmmakers and artists.

In 2016, Oskouei was awarded the Amnesty International Prize at the Berlinale (an award he shared with the festival's Golden Bear winner, Fire at Sea). He also had been honoring as the recipient of the festival's True Vision Award at True/False Film Fest in Missouri as the best documentary filmmaker of the year 2016.

Oskouei has been a judge at 130 renowned film festivals such as: CPH Docs (Denmark), Jean Rouch international film festival (France), Kraków International Film Festival (Poland), Tehran International Short Film Festival (Iran) and Cinema Verite international film festival (Iran), as well as being a cultural ambassador for the United Nations' humanitarian committee UCHA. Oskouei is also on the boards of; Iranian Short Film Association, Documentary Filmmakers of Iran, The National Iranian Photographers Association, European Documentary Network EDN, International Documentary Association IDA. He also teaches at film schools around Iran as well as being active in the Tehran Arts and Culture Association. Oskouei has been awarded many prizes. Here is a partial list; The icon from IDFA Netherlands, The Reva and David Logan Grand Jury Award & Full Frame Inspiration Award, Human right award in Berlin film festival, Icon for best film at Hot Docs festival/ Canada, Golden Dragon award best film, Kraków Festival, Best Documentary at Munich/Germany, Best film Documentary Festival Montreal/ Canada.

Starless dreams is ranked above many films of prominent directors. American news and culture paper The Village Voice ranked the documentary 7th Among Village Voice Top 25 Films. Meanwhile, the movie gained 85 scores out of 100 on the metacritic movie website

Oskoeui was the subject of a retrospective at New York's Anthology Film Archives, 2018. It included Starless Dreams, his medium-length films Nose, Iranian Style, The Other Side of Burka, The Last Days of Winter and It's Always Late for Freedom, and four shorts. This is the most complete series devoted to his work in the United States so far.

== Selected filmography ==
- 2019 || Sunless Shadows || Director, producer, screenwriter
- 2016 || Starless Dreams || Director, producer, screenwriter
- 2011 || The Last Days of Winter || Director, producer, screenwriter
- 2009 || The Taste of Iran (episode 1&4) || Director, screenwriter
- 2007 || It's always late for freedom || Director, producer, screenwriter
- 2005 || Nose, Iranian Style || Director, producer, screenwriter
- 2004 || The Other Side of Burka || Director, producer, co-director of photography, screenwriter
- 2000 || My Mother's Home, Lagoon || Director, co-producer, screenwriter

== Member of jury film festivals ==
- The jury member in the 35th Tehran International short Film Festival, Tehran, Iran, 9–13 Nov 2018.
- The head of the jury in the short film competition section of the 58th Kraków Film Festival, Poland,2018
- The jury member in the CPH:DOX, Copenhagen International Documentary Film Festival, Denmark, 16–26 March 2017.
- The jury member in the 36th Anthropology Jean Rouch international film festival, Paris, France, 2016

== Performance art ==
Mehrdad Oskouei performance art directorial debut at Shirin Gallery in Tehran, Nov. 2015 along with Sarvnaz Alambeigi as well as Atieh Atarzadeh and Loghman Khaledi.

A conversation is a dialog that happens between two or more people. In documentary filmmaking there are many ways of entering into a dialog with the subject and the result is recorded. What the audience sees in the end is the product of these dialogs. In the collection of films shown at Shirin Gallery, the artists struggle to attain this concept of dialog in documentary film through various approaches with this dialog, and then by removing the documentary itself enter into a dialog inside the gallery in different ways. Oskouei explains this performance as "...We have created an atmosphere where adults could imagine what laws they could have broken as children that would have sent them to a juvenile correction institute. We created a minimal setting that resembled the detention facility, volunteers confessed, filled out forms and were given uniforms, they were weighed and measured and were quarantined. Finally they were told that the documentary was about to begin and asked if they were they ready to be interviewed. Most agreed to be interviewed. What took me unaware and made this performance unique for me were the reactions of the participants. Their discomfort and anxiety was enough to transform them into real criminals."

== History of the Visual Heritage Center of Iran ==
The Visual Heritage Center of Iran is a specialized organization dedicated to the collection and study of Iranian historical photographs and post cards. It was founded in 2011 and has been continuously active in the field of historical photographs and post cards. Since its inception this center has had three main sections; research, archives and administration and has been under the directorship of its founder, Mehrdad Oskouie. Working together with his group of specialists the center focuses its attention on; history, photography, literature, cinema, the preservation and documentation of historical artifacts, folk art, architecture and handicrafts. They publish their valuable findings from their research onto visual documents of Iran and the world of Islam. Oskouei said: "Professor Iraj Afshar who invited me for a meeting. He told me I had chosen a difficult task, adding that old post cards and historic photographs were very expensive. He told me that if I wanted to and was able to, I should do it, but I should do it right. Collecting by itself is useless, and my goal wasn't just to be a collector, but to do something of cultural importance. He asked that if I succeeded to put my collection into a book and publish it. I was motivated by the things he told me and I made such a book my goal. Soon after I was contacted by the Prince Claus Cultural Center in Holland and informed that I had been chosen as the recipient for the 2010 cultural person of the year monetary award to be used for developing a project concerning Iranian culture. With the monetary prize I received I was able to purchase a large number of historic Iranian post cards and photographs. It also gave me the opportunity to travel and visit libraries around the world to research about historic post cards". Together we began our research. We formed the hub of the new research group into historic Iranian photographs and post cards. Gradually our research group has grown in numbers and the following leading experts in their field have joined us.

== Exhibitions organized by the Visual Heritage Center of Iran ==
- Iran depicted in historic post cards at the Dutch Embassy
- Iran depicted in historic post cards, The City House of Photographs museum, February 2010
- Iran women as depicted in historical post cards, The City House of Photographs museum, September 2011
- Everyday life in Iran as depicted in historic post cards，The City House of Photographs museum, April 2011
- The photographs of Antoin Sevruguin，The City House of Photographs museum, Oct. 2013
- Handicrafts and tradesmen of the Ghajar dynasty as depicted in historic post cards，The City House of Photographs museum, April 2014

== Bibliography ==
Following are publications by various publishers working with the Visual Heritage Center of Iran. At present there are some new publications about photographs and post cards awaiting publication.

- Research

1- The Haj as depicted by historic post cards，A project conceived by Mehrdad Oskouie，Director of Research; Akram Karimzadeh Tehran, Iran A joint publication of Gamon Publishers and the Publications Center of Tabatabai University, 2016

2- The province of Gilan as depicted in historic post cards; A project conceived by Mehrdad Oskouie; Director of Research-Masoumeh Almasi Mashak; Ilia Publications; 2014

3- There must be another photograph: Notes for post cards by Iranian writers for 66 famous world authors; a project conceived by Mehrdad Oskouie; Director of Research- Soheila Shams; Herfe Honarmand Publications; 2013

- Photography

1- Memories and Views: Portraits of Contemporary Iranian Figures in Art and Culture by Mehrdad Oskouie; Tehran; Yesaveli Publishers; 2011

2- The Seven Climates of Iran; Tehran; Yesaveli Publications; 2009

3- Iran: The land of Compassion, Tehran; Yesaveli Publications; 2007

== Narration ==
- Books on Tape "From Today's Residents" selected poetry of Sohrab Sepehri; with music by Reza Najfar, Novin Talking Book Publishers

Tehran, 2014

- Books on Tape "Jonathon Livingston Seagull" with music by Mehdi Zareh

Novin Talking Book Publishers, Tehran, 2014

== Photography ==
Oskouei is also a documentary photographer. He travels throughout Iran giving seminars on this art.

== Group exhibitions ==
- 1st Participating Photographic Society Exhibition. Tehran, 1993
- Photography Exhibition UNESCO environmental committee, Tehran, 1994
- 1st 'KLIK' group show

With Mohammad Tehrani, Koroush Shabgard and Babak Forutani, Green Gallery, Tehran, 2001

- 2nd 'KLIK' group show

With Mohammad Tehrani, Koroush Shabgard and Babak Foroutani, Photo House of Iran, Tehran, 2001

- 21st International black and white photography exhibition (FIAP) Amsterdam, 1994
- 24th International black and white photography exhibition (FIAP) China, 1998
- Group Photography show in Finland, 1999
- Group photography exhibit "According to Contemporary Iranian Photographers"

Pardis Mellat Gallery, Tehran, 2013
