= Starless Dreams =

- Film poster
- Directed by: Mehrdad Oskouei
- Written by: Mehrdad Oskouei
- Produced by: Mehrdad Oskouei, Oskouei Film Production
- Cinematography: Mohammad Hadadi
- Edited by: Amir Adibparvar
- Music by: Afshin Azizi
- Distributed by: Cinema Guild
- Release date: 16 February 2016
- Running time: 76min
- Country: Iran
- Language: Persian

Starless Dreams is a 2016 Iranian documentary directed by Mehrdad Oskouei.

== Synopsis ==
Teenage girls living in a juvenile detention center near Tehran discuss the actions and circumstances that lead to their incarceration.

== Festivals ==
- 10th Asian Pacific Screen Awards, Australia, 2 December 2016.
- 16th Pyongyang International Film Festival, North Korea. 19–28 September 2018. ‘Informative screening section
- 29th Carthage Film Festival, Tunis, Tunisia. 3–10 November 2018
- Humboldt University, Faculty of Theology, Berlin, Germany. 3–14 December 2018
- Rencontres du Film Documentaire de Mellionnec, France. 28 June – 1 July 2018.
- Human Rights Nights Film Festival, Bologna, Italy. 4–13 May 2018.

Venue: Cinema Lumière of the Cineteca di Bologna.

- 13ème Festival International du Film Oriental de Genève (FIFOG), Suisse. 21–29 April 2018. Competition section
- 5e Festival Cinema du Monde de Sherbrooke, Québec, Canada. 9–15 April 2018. Competition section
- 3e Rencontres Hivernales du Documentaire de Grignan, France. Janvier 19-27, 2018.
- 4th Budapest International Documentary Festival, Hungary. 24–28 January 2018. Competition section
- 27e Festival du Film Documentaire Traces de Vies, Clermont Ferrand, France. 27 November – 3 December 2017.
- China Society of Documentary Films, First Silk Road International Documentary Film Festival, Grand Ceremony, 2 December 2017.
- Celebration of Iranian Cinema at UCI. University of California, Irvine, USA. 25–27 August 2017.
- SOS Villages d’Enfants Monde, Luxembourg. Screening date: Novembre 23, 2017
- 7ème Festival de Films Documentaires ENFANCES DANS LE MONDE, Paris, France. 16–18 November 2017.
- 12th Pravo Ljudski Film Festival, Sarajevo. 9–12 November 2017.
- 25th Rendezvous with Madness Film Festival, Toronto, Canada. 3–11 November 2017.
- 22ème Festival International du Cinéma d’Auteur de Rabat, Maroc. Octobre 27- Novembre 3, 2017.
- Yamagata International Documentary Film Festival, Japan. 5–12 October 2017. « New Asian Currents » Competition
- 24th Adana International Film Festival, Turkey. 25 September – 1 October 2017.
- 7th Favourites Film Festival, Berlin, Germany. 20 to 24 September 2017.
- Celebration of Iranian Cinema at UCI. University of California, Irvine, USA. 25–27 August 2017.
- New Zealand International Film Festival (NZIFF). 14 July – 7 August 2017.
- Festival Résistances, Foix, France. 7–15 July 2017. «Les Visages de la Violence» section.
- Favourites Film Festival, Bremen (24-28 May 2017) and Berlin, Germany. 20 to 24 September 2017.
- 45e Rencontre Cinéma Digne-Les-Bains & Alpes-de-Haute-Provence, France. 2–5 May 2017.
- 3rd Slovenian International Film Festival for Children and Youth Eye on Film, Slovenia. 3–9 May and 3–8 October 2017.
- 28th Ankara International Film Festival, Turkey. 20–30 April 2017.
- Mondes en Images, 4ème Rencontres documentaires à Cucuron, France. 6–9 April 2017.
- CPH:DOX, Copenhagen International Documentary Film Festival, DENMARK. 16–26 March 2017.

26 February – 5 March 2017. ‘Teen Dox’ competition

- 13th International Documentary Film Festival ZagrebDox, ZAGREB CROATIA.

Iranian Film Screening dates: Januvary 29 & 30, 2017.

- Persische Kulturwoche München, Germany. 27 January – 4 February 2017.

Screening date: 18 January.

- Berlin cinema Filmkunst 66, Bleibtreustraße 12, 10623 Berlin, Germany.

Screening for « DEUTSCHE FILMAKADEMIE »

- 6th Iranian Film Festival, Prague, Brno and Bratislava, Republic Czech.10-21 January 2017.
- 9th this human world International Human Rights Film Festival, Vienna, Austria. 1–11 December 2016.

TERRE DES FEMMES, Tuebingen, Germany. 23–30 November 2016. TERRE DES FEMMES, Tuebingen, Germany. 23–30 November 2016.

- Festival Résistances, Foix, France. 7–15 July 2017. «Les Visages de la Violence» section.
- 3rd Brisbane Asia Pacific Film Festival, Australia, 23 November – 4 December 2016.
- 20th Tallinn Black Nights Film Festival, Estonia, 11–27 November 2016.
- 29th exground filmfest, Wiesbaden, Germany, 11–20 November 2016.
- MOVE IT! Film Festival, Dresden, Germany, 8–13 November 2016
- 21ème Rencontres du Cinema Documentaire, Cinéma Le Méliès à Montreuil, France, screening date: 5 November 2016.
- 35th Jean Rouch International Film Festival, Paris, France, 5 November – 11 December 2016, screening date: Saturday, 5 November 2016.
- 14th Festival Internacional de Cine de Morelia, Mexico, 21–30 October 2016, program "Year of Germany in Mexico 2016/2017".
- Festival des Libertés, Bruxelles, Belgique, 20–29 October 2016.
- 31st Unabhaengiges FilmFest Osnabrueck, Germany, 19–23 October 2016, "Children Rights Competition" section.
- Inconvenient Films festival, Lithuania, Vilnius, 13–23 October 2016.
- Antenna Documentary Festival, Sydney, Australia, 11–16 October 2016, competition
- 25th Hot Springs Documentary Film Festival, Arkansas, United States, 7–16 October 2016, competition section
- 60th BFI London Film Festival, UK, 5–16 October 2016, "Competition – Grierson"
- XXVI Message to Man International Film Festival, Saint Petersburg, Russia, 23–30 September 2016, "International Competition" section.
- 12th Zurich Film Festival, Switzerland, 22 September – 2 October 2016, "Border Lines" section.
- Bergen International Film Festival, Norway, 20–28 September 2016, "Checkpoints" competition.
- The Dokfilmwoche in the fsk Kino and Sputnik Kino in Berlin, Germany, screening dates: 1–7 September 2016.
- DokuFest PRIZREN, KOSOVA, 5–13 August 2016, Human Rights Competition section.
- 65h Melbourne International Film Festival, Australia, 28 July – 14 August 2016.
- New Directors, New Films’ Festival, Espinho, Portugal, 20–27 June 2016, Golden Lynx Competition section.
- New York Human Rights Watch Film Festival, United States, 10–19 June 2016.
- 39th Norwegian Short Film Festival / 'International feature documentary Programme', Grimstad, Norway, 8–12 June 2016.
- Cinema at the Deutsches Filmmuseum Frankfurt, Germany, screening dates: 4 and 5 June 2016.
- 4th Cinema in Sneakers Film Festival for Children & Youth, Warsaw, Poland, 1–12 June 2016.
- 3rd Köln Iranian Film Festival, Germany, 26–29 May 2016.
- 13th International Documentary Film Festival CRONOGRAF, Chisinau, R. of Moldova, 12–18 May 2016, competition section.
- 31st International Documentary Film Festival (DOK.fest), Munich, Germany, 5 – 15 May 2016, competition section "DOK.horizonte"
- Hot Docs International Documentary Film Festival, Toronto, Canada, 28 April – 8 May 2016
- 19th Full Frame Documentary Film Festival, North Carolina, United States, 7–10 April 2016
- Middle East Now Festival, Florence, Italy, 5–10 April 2016
- Ambulante Documentary Film Festival, Mexico, 31 March – 2 June 2016.
- 18th Thessaloniki Documentary Film Festival, Greece, 11–20 March 2016
- Griffin 7, Williams College, Williamstown, Massachusett, United States, 8 March 2016.
- 18th One World International Human Rights Documentary Film Festival, Prague, Czech Republic, 7–16 March 2016
- 17th Tempo Documentary Festival, Stockholm, Sweden, 7–13 March 2016, "TOP DOCS" Non Competitive Festival
- 13th True/False Film Festival, Columbia, Missouri, United States, 3–6 March 2016
- 66th Internationale Filmfestspiele Berlinale-Generation 14plus, Germany, 11–21 February 2016

== Awards ==
- Winner of: Best Documentary Feature Film at 10th edition of Asian Pacific Screen Awards
- Winner of: Cercle d’Or – Best Documentary at the 5e Festival Cinema du Monde de Sherbrooke, Québec, Canada, 2018
- Winner of: Best Film – Senior Jury Award
- Winner of: Best Film – Junior Jury Award

at the 4th Budapest International Documentary Festival, Hungary, 2018

- Winner of: Grand Prix – Traces de Vies at the 27e Festival du Film Documentaire Traces de Vies, Clermont Ferrand, France, 2017.
- Winner of: Best Documentary Film at the Silk Road International Documentary Film Festival, China, 2017.
- Winner of: Jury’s Special Mention at the 12th Pravo Ljudski Film Festival, Sarajevo, 2017.
- Winner of: Audience Award at the 22e Festival International du Cinéma d’Auteur de Rabat, Morocco, 2017.
- Winner of: Best Film-Teen Dox Jury Award at the 13th International Documentary Film Festival ZagrebDox, ZAGREB, CROATIA, 2017
- 32nd Annual IDA Documentary Awards, Friday 9 December 2016, Paramount Studios in Los Angeles, USA.

The *Pare Lorentz Award* recognizes films that demonstrate exemplary filmmaking while focusing on the appropriate use of the natural environment, justice for all and the illumination of pressing social problems.

- Winner of *Pare Lorentz Award* by the 32nd International Documentary Association (IDA), 2016.

At the 29th exground filmfest, Wiesbaden, Germany, 2016

- Winner of: Audience Award
- Winner of: Youth Jury Prize
- Winner of Best Feature Documentary at the 10th Asia Pacific Screen Awards, Brisbane Convention and Exhibition Centre (BCEC), Australia, 2016
- Winner of Best Film at the 12th move it Internationale Filmfestival, Dresdener, Germany, 2016
- Winner of Grand Prix Nanook – Jean Rouch at the 35th Jean Rouch IFF, Paris, France
- Winner of Pare Lorentz Award by the 32nd International Documentary Association (IDA), 2016, at Paramount Studios in Los Angeles, United States. The Pare Lorentz Award recognizes films that demonstrate exemplary filmmaking while focusing on the appropriate use of the natural environment, justice for all and the illumination of pressing social problems.
- Winner of Prix Smart at ‘Festival des Libertés’, Bruxelles, Belgique, 2016
- Winner of Best Film – Young Jury Award at the 31st Unabhaengiges FilmFest Osnabrueck, Germany, 2016
- Winner of Special Jury Award at Antenna Documentary Festival, Sydney, Australia, 2016
- Winner of Best International Documentary at 25th Hot Springs Documentary Film Festival, Arkansas, United States, 2016
- Winner of the Grierson Prize for Best Documentary Feature at the 60th BFI London Film Festival, UK, 2016
- Winner of Full-length Documentary Film Award at the 26th International Film Festival Message to Man, Russia, 2016
- Winner of Special Mention Human Rights Award at DokuFest Prizren, Kosova, 2016
- Winner of Cineuropa Audience Award at the 'New Directors, New Films' Festival, Espinho, Portugal
- Winner of Honorable Mention
- Winner of Special Mention Youth's Jury Award at the 4th Cinema in Sneakers Film Festival for Children & Youth, Warsaw, Poland, 2016
- Winner of Grand Prix at the 13th International Documentary Film Festival CRONOGRAF, Chisinau, R. of Moldova, 2016
- Winner of Women Special Prize
- Winner of Best Photography Award
- Winner of the Full Frame Inspiration Award, Durham, North Carolina, 10 April 2016 at the 19th Full Frame Documentary Film Festival, North Carolina, United States, 2016
- Winner of the Reva and David Logan Grand Jury Award, Duke University, 2016
- Winner of True Vision Award for Mehrdad Oskouei at the 13th True/False Film Festival, Columbia, Missouri, United States, 2016
- Winner of Amnesty International Film Prize at the 66th Internationale Filmfestspiele Berlinale-Generation 14plus, Germany, 2016

== Reception ==
The film has received positive critical reviews, holding a 100% rating on Rotten Tomatoes based on 16 reviews.

American news and culture paper The Village Voice ranked the documentary 7th Among Village Voice Top 25 Films. Meanwhile, the movie gained 85 scores out of 100 on the Metacritic movie website

Scott Tobias of Variety said, "Oskouei is given a window into homes where, as one subject puts it, "pain drips from the walls," but "Starless Dreams" isn't a cavalcade of misery. With confinement comes safety, and with a roomful of like-aged girls from common backgrounds, the rare opportunity for friendship and fun."

Leigh Kolb of Bitch Media said, "Oskouei's style as a documentarian would seem invasive if it weren't so empathetic. His voice is present and strong, and he asks the girls probing questions: about their crimes, about their histories, and about their hopes."

Stephen Holden from The New York Times said, "Roger Ebert once called the movies 'a machine that generates empathy,' and Starless Dreams ... is just such a machine. With the conceptual rigor and emotional directness associated with the best of Iranian cinema Oskouei simply listens to the stories of those who have never been listened to before."

Deborah Young from The Hollywood Reporter said, "Mehrdad Oskouei's reputation as one of Iran's finest documentary filmmakers grows film by film. Starless Dreams is the perfect example of how powerful simplicity can be, when it's underpinned by compassion for its subject."

Kenigsperg from The New York Times said, "Although the movie bears some resemblance to the films made by Frederick Wiseman within institutions, the acknowledged presence of the director, Mehrdad Oskouei, creates a constant tension. The girls — identified by first names or nicknames like 'Nobody' and '651' — show varying degrees of comfort with Mr. Oskouei's questions, some matter-of-factly discussing drugs or stabbings, and others seemingly reluctant to look toward the camera. Yet 'Starless Dreams' suggests that the center's grounds, where the girls play in the snow or work in a greenhouse, are kinder than the world outside, and that release is a fraught prospect. So if 'Starless Dreams' inspires conflicted feelings in viewers, it may be by design. It's hard not to want to flee, and it's hard to look away."

Kenji Fujishima from KINO SCOPE said, In some ways, Starless Dreams is a standard talking-heads documentary, with much of it made up of Oskouei’s interviews with the girls in the detention center as learns their histories and how they feel about their lives. But he also alternates these intimate chats with more Frederick Wiseman-esque observational segments of the girls playing and interacting with authority figures and relatives. These fly-on-the-wall scenes help transcend the grim nature of the film’s subject, showing how capable these troubled girls still are of experiencing childlike wonder.
