= Lida Chan =

Cambodian filmmaker

- Born: 25 March 1980 (age 45)
- Occupation: Film director

Lida Chan (born 25 March 1980) is a Cambodian filmmaker.

== Career ==
Lida Chan joined Bophana Center in 2006, where, as an archivist, she specializes in the analysis of Khmer Rouge archives. She also works as a radio journalist for Radio France Internationale, where she covered the trial of former Khmer Rouge cadre Duch.

In 2010, Lida Chan turned into documentary filmmaking after being trained by Cambodian filmmaker and producer Rithy Panh.

== Filmography ==
Year	Film	Honours
2010	My Yesterday Night	Selected at the 17th Vesoul International Film Festival of Asian Cinema
2012	Red Wedding	Award for Best Mid-Length Documentary 2012 at the International Documentary Filmfestival Amsterdam (IDFA; Aljazeera Golden Award 2013 at the Aljazeera International Documentary Film Festival (Qatar); Jury Prize 2013 at the Gdansk DocFilm Festival; Special Jury Prize 2013 at the Human Rights Human Dignity International Film Festival; Best South East Asian Human Rights Film 2013 at the FreedomFilmFest (Kuala Lumpur, Malaysia); Special Mention Award 2014 at the Salaya International Documentary Film Festival (Thailand)
