= Genderwrecked =

2018 video game

- itch.io header art
- Developers: Heather Flowers, Ryan Rose Aceae
- Composer: Medley Baxter
- Platforms: Windows, MacOS, Linux
- Release: 18 January 2018
- Genre: Interactive fiction
- Mode: Single-player

Genderwrecked (styled as GENDERWRECKED) is a 2018 video game created by independent developers Heather Flowers and Gendervamp, the pseudonym of Ryan Rose Aceae. Described as a "post-apocalyptic genderpunk visual novel", Genderwrecked is a work of interactive fiction in which the player is invited to explore themes and issues around gender through the comic representation of monsters. The game was developed by Flowers and Aceae using the Ren'Py visual novel software as a personal expression of their own experiences. Upon release, Genderwrecked received praise from several publications, with critics praising the game's balance of humor and earnest discourse on gender and identity. Following release, Genderwrecked received the 'Jury Award' at the Melbourne Queer Games Festival in October 2018, and was briefly showcased by the Smithsonian American Art Museum.

== Gameplay ==
A screenshot of gameplay in Genderwrecked, depicting the player-nominated choice of pronouns in the game.

Similar to other Ren'Py visual novels, Genderwrecked is a linear work of interactive fiction in which players are able to make choices to progress the narrative. Players are invited to "discover the meaning of gender" through visiting a cast of grotesque and surreal characters based in a post-apocalyptic setting, with the choice open to the player to talk, fight or kiss each of them. Initially, players are able to select from a wide list of pronouns or input custom pronouns, which are then reflected in the game. As the player interacts with the characters, each confide in the player in how they define their own gender, with each varying in comic and surreal ways. At the end of the game, it is left open to the player to define their own gender using a text box.

== Development and release ==
Genderwrecked was developed by game designer Heather Flowers and multidisciplinary artist Ryan Rose Aceae. The pair were inspired to make the game to externalise their own personal experiences, with Flowers stating the game aimed to convey "the experience of dealing with your own gender" to a transgender audience and "make people like us feel seen" in a work of fiction. The developers clarified that the game was not intended to be "representative" of trans identities as a whole and "just trying to depict the reality of these experiences we have", avoiding an educational or empathetic tone. Genderwrecked was developed over the course of over one year, with Flowers coding the game and creating the background art, Aceae creating the character art and most of the writing, and Medley Baxter composing the soundtrack for the game. Developed using Ren'Py, Aceae stated that the visual novel format was desirable as the genre facilitates "talking about people and relationships" and "pouring that into avatars (is) really easy in visual novels." Aceae stated development process behind the game was "exhausting and overwhelming" as "one of the biggest things that either of us has worked on".

== Reception ==
Genderwrecked received a positive reception from critics, with praise directed to the game's comic and earnest discourse on gender and identity. Writing for Venture Beat, Stephanie Chan praised the game as "humorous, defiant in its glibness, and moving in its sincerity", assessing the game was "genuine and heartfelt" in how it "exchanges its flippant jokes for an earnest dialogue about how messy it can be to unravel the threads of identity". Similarly, Alice O'Connor of Rock Paper Shotgun praised the game as "funny, charming and thoughtful". Writing for Unwinnable, Khee Hoon Chan stated the game was a "rare' instance of "care (being) taken into depicting multifaceted stories about gender", praising the "candor and humor" of the game in "breaking down murky gender concepts through metaphors and allusions, which can be occasionally enigmatic but almost always relatable". Chan highlighted the game's "warmly and actively mindful" use of gender categories and pronouns created a "sincerity" that insulated it from transphobic allusions as to the intent of the game's use of monsters. Similarly, Kate Gray of Kotaku stated the game was "poignant", highlighting the game's open-ended conclusion in which the game allows players to write their own interpretation on the nature of gender. Jay Allen of PC Gamer praised the game's characterisation, observing how the "intensely vulnerable" tone of the game "defies any pressure to be the right kind of representation" in creating imperfect, imprecise and hostile characters, evaluating that the game conveyed an "earnest affirmation of (a) space where someone can safely be something messy and monstrous that doesn't have their shit together."

=== Accolades ===
Genderwrecked received the 'Jury Award' at the Melbourne Queer Games Festival in October 2018. In August 2019, the Smithsonian American Art Museum exhibited Genderwrecked as part of a two-day annual interactive event titled 'SAAM Arcade' under the theme of Representation Matters to "feature games that address issues of representation for diverse indie developers".
