= Antoine Viviani =

French filmmaker and multidisciplinary artist

- Occupation: French filmmaker
- Known for: Little Blue Nothing (documentary); In Limbo (documentary)
- Awards: Doclab Award

Antoine Viviani is a french filmmaker and multidisciplinary artist based in Paris.

== Career ==
Viviani directed in 2011 In Situ, a documentary essay about artistic interventions in the urban space in Europe, featuring artists, activists and philosophers. It received the Doclab Award at IDFA in Amsterdam in 2011 and the Best Film Award at London Open City Documentary Festival in 2012.

In 2015, Viviani produced and directed In Limbo, a documentary essay telling the story of a digital spirit, performed by the French-Canadian writer Nancy Huston, dissolving into the memory of the Internet. The film stages Internet founding fathers and visionaries Gordon Bell, Brewster Kahle, Cathal Gurrin, and Ray Kurzweil among many others, filmed as ghosts, using a special volumetric depth camera. An interactive online shortened version, In Limbo Interactive, was released by Arte and the NFB on a specific web-platform, where the viewer could connect its own data. The film premiered in Nov. 2015 as part of the international competition of CPH:Dox in Copenhagen and received several awards.

In 2019, Viviani created with Pierre Alain Giraud the location-based immersive art installation Solastalgia. Wearing a specific AR equipment, a group of 10 people explores a 400 square meter landscape of a deserted, post apocalyptic future where the last generations have decided to transform into ghosts, thanks to a machine, repeating the same gestures over and over again, haunting the planet forever. Viviani has said to have been largely inspired by Adolfo Bioy Casares’ The Morel Invention to write the experience. Icelandic visual artist Gabriela Fridriksduttir, composer Valgeir Sigurdson and choreographer Erna Omarsdottir collaborated on the piece. Solastalgia got selected in the 2020 New Frontier selection of the Sundance Film Festival and was exhibited at Champs Libres museum in Rennes, France, and at The National Gallery of Iceland in June 2020.

== Works ==
=== Documentary ===
Year	Title	Role	Ref.
2009	Little Blue Nothing	Producer and co-director with Vincent Moon	
2011	In Situ	Director and producer	
2015	In Limbo	Director and producer	

=== Awards and distinctions ===
- 2012: Doclab Award, International Documentary Festival of Amsterdam for In Situ
- 2012: Time Out Best City Film, London Open City Documentary Festival, for In Situ
- 2016: Best Emergent Filmmaker Award, London Open City Docs Festival, for In Limbo
- 2016: Prix de la création, Festival Traces de vie, for In Limbo

=== Installation ===
- 2019: Solastalgia, co-directed with Pierre-Alain Giraud
