= The Storm Makers =

- The Storm Makers poster
- Directed by: Guillaume Suon
- Produced by: Rithy Panh; Julien Roumy
- Cinematography: Guillaume Suon
- Edited by: Barbara Bossuet
- Music by: Marc Marder
- Distributed by: CAT&Docs
- Release date: October 2, 2014 (Busan International Film Festival)
- Running time: 66 minutes
- Countries: Cambodia; France
- Language: Khmer

The Storm Makers is a 2014 documentary film directed by Guillaume Suon about human trafficking in Cambodia. The term "Storm Makers" refers to the traffickers and the damage they inflict on villages and families. One such trafficker shown in the film claims he has sold more than 500 Cambodian girls, some as young as 14.

The film premiered at the 2014 Busan International Film Festival (BIFF) and won the Mecenat Award for Best Asian Documentary Film.

== Production ==
Produced by Rithy Panh and Julien Roumy, The Storm Makers is a Cambodian-French co-production by Bophana Production and Tipasa Production.

The Storm Makers was produced in association with ARTE FRANCE - La Lucarne and POV, with the support of Centre national du cinéma et de l'image animée, Région Midi-Pyrénées, Fonds francophone de production audiovisuelle du Sud, Gucci Tribeca Documentary Fund, Sundance Institute Documentary Film Program, IDFA Bertha Fund, Worldview, Busan International Film Festival (AND), Cambodia Film Commission and Bophana Audiovisual Resource Center.

The film was shot in Battambang province, in Cambodia, between 2013 and 2014.

== Distribution ==
The Storm Makers is distributed by CAT&Docs.

== Awards ==
- Mecenat Award for Best Asian Documentary Film 2014 at the Busan International Film Festival (BIFF) 2014
- Inspiration Award at the Full Frame Documentary Film Festival 2015 (Durham, U.S.A.)
- “Windows on the World” Prize for the Best Feature Film at Milan's Festival of African, Asian and Latin American Cinema 2015
- Special Mention Award at the Salaya International Documentary Film Festival 2015 (Thailand)
