= It's Always Late for Freedom =

It's Always Late for Freedom (Hamishe Baraye Azadi Dir Ast)
- Directed by: Mehrdad Oskouei
- Written by: Mehrdad Oskouei
- Produced by: Mehrdad Oskouei, Oskouei Film Production
- Cinematography: Ashkan Ashkani
- Edited by: Loghman Khaledi
- Music by: Ali Samadpour
- Release date: 2007
- Running time: 53 min
- Country: Iran
- Language: Persian

It's Always Late for Freedom is a 2008 Iranian documentary directed by Mehrdad Oskouei. The film depicts the life of three teenager boys in Tehran House of Correction. They are portrayed as victims of serious social problems such as addiction, poverty and divorce, which the Iranian society is faced with.

== Festivals and awards ==
- 9th Thessaloniki International Film Festival, March 16 to 25, 2007, Greece
- 3rd Ukrainian International Documentary Film Festival, 2007, Kiev, Ukraine
- Special Jury Diploma
- Vision du Reel International Documentary Film Festival, 2007, Nyon, Switzerland
- 2nd Iranian Film Festival, 2007, Utrecht, Netherland
- 5th Lisbon International Documentary Film Festival, 2007, Lisbon, Portugal
- 50th International Leipzig Documentary and Animated Film Festival, 2007, Leipzig, Germany
- 10th Les Rencontres Internationals du documentaries DE, 2007, Montreal, Canada
- Courmayeur Noir in Festival, 2007, Rome, Italy
- 7th International Film Festival Watch Documentaries, 2007, Warsaw, Poland
- Nominated of The Best Mid-Length Award
- 4th Tri Continental Film Festival, 2008, New Delhi, India
- 7th Doc Point – Helsinki Documentary Film Festival, 2008, Helsinki, Finland
- Festival Black Movie, February 1 to 10, 2008, Switzerland
- Hot Docs Int’l Documentary Film Festival, 2008, Toronto, Canada
- Fifth Golden Apricot International Film Festival, Yerevan Int’l Film Festival July 13 to 20, 2008, Yerevan, Armenia
- Argenmex Film Festival, 18 to 26 Oct 2008, Mexico
- 1th Fida Doc'souss - International Documentary Film Festival in Aghadir, Morocco, 2008
- 15th Int’l Documentary Sheffield film Festival, 2008, Sheffield, UK
- Nominated of John Grierson Award
- Med Int’l Film Festival, 2008, Rome, Italy
- Museum of Fine Arts (MFA), Boston, 2008, Boston, USA
- CNEX Int’l Film Festival, 2008, Beijing, China and Taiwan
- 8th Festival du Film Amazigh, 2009, Siddi bel abbas
- Int’l Children's Film Festival (CMS), 2009, India
- 6th Planet Documentary Review Film Festival, 2009, Warsaw, Poland
- School of Oriental and African Studies (University of London/ SOAS), 2009, UK
- The Rendezvous With Madness Film Festival, 2009, Toronto, Canada
- Middle East Now Int’l Film Festival, 2012, Florence, Italy
- ”Retrospective of Mehrdad Oskouei’s films, Images Cinema, 2011, Williamston, USA
- Bill Cosford Cinema at the University of Miami, 2011, Miami, USA
- “Retrospective of Mehrdad Oskouei”, DAS IRANISCHE WIEN, Filmarchiv Austria, 2012, Vienna, Austria
- Special Jury Award* at the 3rd Ukrainian Int'l Documentary Film Festival, 2007, Ukraine
- Runner of Trophy* at the TRI Continental Film Festival, 2008, New Delhi, India
- The Best Mid-Length Documentary Award* at the Hot Docs Int’l Documentary Film Festival, 2008, Toronto, Canada
- Special Jury Award* at the Med Int’l Film Festival, 2008, Rome, Italy
- Mention of the Jury* at the 6th Planet Documentary Review Film Festival, 2009, Warsaw, Poland

== Film reviews ==
- The film expresses the obvious and fundamentally negative aspects of juvenile incarceration

By Omid Tofighian

It's Always Late for Freedom is a film about the most sensitive moments associated with transition and the most potent emotions it evokes. The film is about a ‘rite of passage’ or, more accurately, a ‘baptism of fire’ that three children are initiated through. On a more theoretical level, the film can also be interpreted as a simile expressing the trials and tribulations of societies or nations during the course of progress.

Mehrdad Oskouei's documentary must not simply be seen as only a tale about the lives of children in a juvenile detention centre. It is also a reflection of some of the most compelling problems faced by individuals as they struggle toward maturity and the strongest emotions felt as they grapple with social and personal evolution. Stages of development and their corresponding emotions are depicted through the experiences of Oskouei's three protagonists, Vahid, Ali and Sajad. By describing the ordeal of three boys in a house of correction he is simultaneously prescribing possibilities for instilling hope; gaining knowledge through feelings of regret; and understanding the significance of innocence in the face of injustice.
