= Tsipi Reibenbach =

Tsipora "Tsipi" Reibenbach (Hebrew: ציפי רייבנבך; born 1950) is an Israeli film director, producer and screenwriter. Most of her work consists of documentary films dealing with painful issues in the Israeli society such as the Holocaust and bereavement. Recipient of the Science and Arts Minister of Israel prize (1996) for directors and screenwriters. Her film Choice and Destiny is one of the most decorated documentary films made by the Israeli industry, among the notable prizes the film won are the Grand Prize in the Yamagata International Documentary Film Festival 1995, two Prizes in the International Documentary Film Festival Amsterdam 1994, and the Scam award (1994) in Cinéma du Réel festival in Paris, France. She received the DAAD scholarship in 2006 as a distinguished Israeli filmmaker.

== Biography ==
Tsipi was born in Poland and immigrated to Israel as a baby in 1950 with her parents, both Holocaust survivors. She graduated a B.Sc. in applied mathematics and physics from Tel-Aviv University in 1969; after graduation she served as a teacher of mathematics, physics and computers in a high school at her hometown, Lod. In the Yom Kippur War (October 1973) she lost her first husband Yitzhak, chemical engineer graduate of the Technion. He was an officer, company commander in the Israeli armored infantry and fell in the battle of the Golan Heights. After his death she turned to film school and graduated with a BFA in Film, Television & Animation from Tel-Aviv University in 1980 and started film making. In 1981 she studied Business management in Tel-Aviv university. She is a mother of three children and a grandmother of four grandchildren. Currently living in Tel-Aviv, Israel.

== Filmography ==
All movies were written, produced and directed by Reibenbach.

- 1976 "the Garden" - Fiction, 1 min.
- 1978 "Hangers" - Fiction, 15 mins.
- 1981 "Widow Plus" - Documentary feature, 5 mothers at the age of 30, the director Reibenbach is one of them, who were widowed in the Yom Kipur War, coping with the memory and the lost, the daily life as a one parented family in the Israeli society. 105 mins.
- 1993 "Choice and Destiny" - Authentic Documentary feature, Reibenbach describes: "In my parents kitchen, Holocaust survivors, I read precisely and gracefully the trace of history, which even in the folds of silence refuses to be forgotten".

Winner:

- Robert and Frances Flaherty Prize (The Grand Prize), Yamagata International Documentary Film Festival, 1995.
- The Audience Award & The Special award of the Jury, International Documentary Film Festival Amsterdam, 1994.
- Prix De La Scam - Festival Cinema Du Reel, Paris, 1994
- AFJ Award for the long documentary film - Créteil International Women's Film Festival, France, 1994.
- Forum section - Berlinale, 1994.
- Silver Sesterce for the film of particular merit, Visions du Réel - Nyon, Switzerland, 1993.
- An award in the Spirit of Freedom Competition - Jerusalem Film Festival, 1993.
- "Top Ten" in the IDFA, 1996,
- Best film produced and set in Mediterranean countries - Nuoro, Italy, 2002.

- 1998 "Three Sisters" Creative documentary feature, Co-produced with the ZDF. The film follows Reibenbach's mother, Fruma, and her two sisters: Karola and Ester, who are now three aged Holocaust susrvivors. Upon the trauma of the Holocaust looms the fear of death. 68 mins.

Winner:

- The Prize of the Haifa Arts Foundation for works in progress, 1997.
- Forum section, Berlinale, 1998.
- The Cinematography Award, DocAviv Film Festival, Tel-Aviv.
- The film was a part of the international exhibition: "Myths of Nations 1945, The battle of memories" presented in the Berlin History Museum between October 2004 and February 2005.
- The film also participated in the San Francisco international Jewish film festival in 1998

- 2003 "A City with no Pity" - Creative documentary. The Film describes Reibenbach's hometown, the ancient city of Lydda, now known as Lod. The rich history of the city of over 5000 years is covered with the current reality in which the city is the center of drug trafficking in Israel. 65 mins. The film was in the Forum section of the Berlinale & in the Hot Docs film festival in Toronto, Canada, both in 2003. The film also took part in MediMed film festival in Barcelona (2004).
