= Nose, Iranian Style =

- Directed by: Mehrdad Oskouei
- Written by: Mehrdad Oskouei
- Produced by: Mehrdad Oskouei, Oskouei Film Production
- Cinematography: Reza Teymouri
- Edited by: Maziar Miri, Babak Karimi
- Music by: Ali Samadpour
- Distributed by: Sheherazad Media International (SMI), Katayoon Shahabi
- Release date: 20 January 2005
- Running time: 52 min
- Country: Iran
- Language: Persian

Nose, Iranian Style is a 2005 Iranian documentary film directed by Mehrdad Oskouei. It is about nose jobs (rhinoplasty) in Iran, which statistically has the most of any country. The documentary employs a semi-comedic tone, with the title referencing the earlier film Divorce, Iranian Style. Nose, Iranian Style relates the trend to politics, with it and the 2007 documentary Tehran: 11 pm connecting it to the importance of appearance, given the taboo of men and women directly and socially interacting. However, Oskouei said the film was truly a critique of excessive consumerism.

Variety critic Deborah Young positively reviewed Nose, Iranian Style as "A surprising, compulsively watchable documentary." It became Oskouei's most famous film internationally.

== Festivals ==
- 18th Int'l Documentary Film Festival Amsterdam (IDFA)(2005/Netherlands)

Nomination Golden MovieSquad DOC U! Award

- Salaam DK – Multi cultural Film Festival (2006/Denmark)
- 2nd Ukrainian Int’l Documentary Film Festival "Contact" (2006/Ukraine)
- 3rd EBS Int’l Documentary Film Festival (2006/Seoul, Korea)
- Oslo Documentary Film Festival (5 – 15 Oct 2006/Norway)
- 5th Tek Film Festival (2006/Italy)
- Sixth Biennial of Iranian Studies in Iran Heritage (2006/London, UK)
- 5th Int’l Documentary & Short Films Festival (2006/Prizren, Kozova)
- 1st Irans Film Festival (2006/Utrecht, Netherland)
- Rio de Janeiro Int'l Film Festival (2006 /Rio, Brazil)
- 9th Int’l 1001 documentary Film Festival (2006/Istanbul, Turkey)
- Film From the South (2006/Norway)
- Museum of Fine Arts US (2006/USA)
- Jakarta Int’l Film Festival (2006/Indonesia)
- UCLA Film & Television Archive (2007/Los Angeles, USA)
- Aljazeera Int'l Film Festival (2007/Aljazzera, Qatar)
- Syracuse Int'l Film Festival (2007/USA)
- Visual Representations of Iran (2008/St.Andrews, Scotland)
- Berlins Cinema Babylon (2008/Germany)
- Faito Documentary Film Festival (2008/Italy)
- Belmont World Film (2009/USA)
- 6th Planet Documentary Review Film Festival (2009/Poland)
- "Retrospective of Mehrdad Oskouei's films", Images Cinema (2011/Williamstown, USA)
- "Retrospective of Mehrdad Oskouei", Das Iranische Wien, Filmarchiv Austria (2012/Vienna. Austria)
