= Red Wedding (film) =

2012 documentary film by Lida Chan and Guillaume Suon

- Red Wedding poster
- Directed by: Lida Chan; Guillaume Suon
- Produced by: Rithy Panh
- Cinematography: Guillaume Suon; Ambroise Boussier; Lida Chan
- Edited by: Guillaume Suon; Lida Chan; Narin Saobora
- Music by: Benjamin Bleuez; Etienne Lechuga
- Distributed by: Women Make Movies; Bophana Production; Tipasa Production
- Release date: November 16, 2012 (IDFA)
- Running time: 58 minutes
- Countries: Cambodia; France
- Language: Khmer

Red Wedding (French: Noces rouges) is a 2012 documentary film co-directed by Lida Chan and Guillaume Suon, which portrays a victim of forced marriage under the Khmer Rouge regime.

The film premiered at the 2012 International Documentary Filmfestival Amsterdam (IDFA) and won the Award for Best Mid-Length Documentary.

== Synopsis ==
Red Wedding is the story of a survivor who pits her humanity against an ideology and a system designed to annihilate people like her. Between 1975 and 1979, at least 250,000 Cambodian women were forced into marriages by the Khmer Rouge. Sochan was one of them. At the age of 16, she was forced to marry a soldier who raped her. After 30 years of silence, Sochan decided to bring her case to the international tribunal set up to try former Khmer Rouge leaders.

== Production ==
Red Wedding is a Cambodian-French co-production produced by Rithy Panh through Bophana Production, Bophana Center and Tipasa Production. It was produced with the support of GIZ, Alter-ciné Foundation, Fonds francophone de production audiovisuelle du Sud, IDFA Fund, Sundance Institute Documentary Film Program, Worldview and Cambodia Film Commission. Red Wedding is the first film about a victim of forced marriage and rape under the Khmer Rouge. Lida Chan and Guillaume Suon's survey began in 2010 when forced marriages were qualified crimes against humanity by the Khmer Rouge tribunal. The film was shot in Pursat province, in Cambodia, between 2010 and 2012.

The film' is distributed by Women Make Movies, Bophana Production and Tipasa Production.

== Reception ==
The film received critical and public acclaim in Cambodia and internationally.

== Awards ==
- Best Mid-Length Documentary - International Documentary Filmfestival Amsterdam (IDFA) 2012
- Golden Award (Mid-length competition) - Aljazeera International Documentary Film Festival 2013 (Doha, Qatar)
- Jury Prize - Gdansk DocFilm Festival 2013 (Poland)
- Special Jury Prize - HRHDIFF 2013 (Yangon, Burma)
- Best South East Asian Human Rights Film - FreedomFilmFest (Kuala Lumpur, Malaysia)
- Special Mention Award - Salaya International Documentary Film Festival (Thailand)
