= 1489 (film) =

- Directed by: Shoghakat Vardanyan
- Edited by: Tigran Baghinyan; Armen Papyan; Hayk Israelyan
- Release date: 2023
- Running time: 76 minutes
- Country: Armenia
- Language: Armenian

1489 is an Armenian war documentary film directed by Shoghakat Vardanyan. The film focuses on the director's personal experience as she and her family cope with the disappearance of her brother, Soghomon Vardanyan, during the Second Nagorno-Karabakh War in the disputed region of Nagorno-Karabakh. The title "1489" refers to the number assigned to Soghomon's unidentified remains, symbolizing the many soldiers who perished in the conflict and whose bodies remained nameless.

== Plot ==
The film chronicles Shoghakat Vardanyan's journey over a period of more than three years, as she documents the search for her brother, who was serving in the Armenian army when the war broke out between the self-proclaimed Republic of Artsakh, and Azerbaijan in September 2020. Soghomon, a 21-year-old music student, went missing on the seventh day of the conflict. Using her smartphone, Shoghakat captures intimate footage of her family's emotional turmoil during their search for answers.

Six months after his disappearance, human remains were found, but it took over a year and a half for the family to receive the results of a DNA test confirming whether the remains were indeed Soghomon's.

== Awards and nominations ==
Accolades received by Interstellar
Award	Date of ceremony	Category	Recipient(s)	Result	Ref.
International Documentary Film Festival Amsterdam	2023	Best Feature-Length Documentary		Won	
International Documentary Film Festival Amsterdam	2023	FIPRESCI Award	Shoghakat Vardanyan	Won	
Krakow Film Festival	2024	International Documentary Film Competition		Nominated	
Trieste Film Festival	2024	Alpe Adria Cinema Award		Won	
Sofia International Film Festival	2024	International Documentary Competition		Nominated	
Sofia International Film Festival	2024	Best Documentary Film		Won	
Doc LA - Los Angeles Documentary Film Festival	2024	Best Documentary Award		Won	
ZagrebDox	2024	International Competition		Nominated	
Buenos Aires International Documentary Film Festival	2024	Best Documentary		Won	

== See also ==
- Armenian cinema
