= Ptakh Jung =

Ukrainian post-rock band

Ptakh_Jung
- Origin: Kyiv, Ukraine
- Years active: 2016-present
- Members: Anton Degtyarev; Volodymyr Babushkin

Ptakh_Jung (Ukrainian: Птах_Юнґ ) is a Ukrainian multi-genre instrumental duo formed by composer, keyboardist, and electronic music producer Anton Dehtiarov (nicknamed Ptakh) and composer and experimental guitarist Volodymyr Babushkin (nicknamed Jung). The group combines contemporary classical music with electronic, post-rock, ambient, and elements of grunge and noise.

The group has created and performed music for Ukrainian cinema.

They describe their music as post-classical electronic impressionism, or "electronic music [that] impresses the audience as deep as if it was a classical one." Their music is atypical for Ukrainian music. The musicians have described their style as a "trip between neoclassicism and post-rock."

In their performances, the duo collaborates with "VJ Reinish" (Svetlana Reinish), a visual artist and animator. They have also created music for the films of young Ukrainian film directors Nikon Romanchenko, Hanna Smoliy, Maksym Nakonechni, Marysia Nikitiuk, Svitlana Lishchynska, Iryna Tsilyk, and Alina Gorlova.

The duo played live at a performance by writer Oleksandr Mykhed, who read his story "Moroki" to their music. They also created music for the documentary film "Obiekt" by Polish director Paulina Skibinska, which won the special jury award at Sundance Film Festival. During the Festival of Silent Film and Contemporary Music, the duo presented a modern original soundtrack to the restored 1930's film Man and Monkey.

Volodymyr Babushkin is also the guitarist of the band Pyryatyn.

== History ==
In 2014, Anton Dehtiarov worked as a production assistant in a recording for the band Veranda, during which he helped to produce the song "Volodya." Whilst working with Veranda, Anton became friends with the band's co-founder Andriy Nedobor and joined the band as a keyboardist where he met Volodymyr, who was the guitarist of the group. Veranda eventually went on hiatus and the members of the band looked for other directions. Anton began working on solo electronic music and Volodymyr started making his own solo guitar recordings. During this time, Anton and Volodymyr began to communicate as friends and began attending parties together. The two would later combine their solo work, which would be used as the basis for Ptakh_Jung's new music.

The duo officially began in 2016. They then began to appear in various venues across Kiev, achieving several collaborations with different visual artists and VJs, including collaborations with Victoria Zhuravleva and Zhenya Ustinova (Zheka).

The duo published "Bird," their first song, on September 27, 2016. On December 16, 2016, they released their first two audiovisual recordings with their songs "D MAJ" and "8 Bit" together with video jockey VJ Reinish.

== Music ==
- Music for the film "No Obvious Signs" by Alina Gorlova.
- Music for the film "Obiekt" by Polish director Paulina Skibinska.
- Music for the film "Coma" by Nikon Romanchenko.
- Music for the film "Intent" by Anna Smoliy based on the novel "Intent!" by Lyubko Deresh.
- Music for the film "Invisible" by Maxim Nakonechny.
- Soundtrack for the movie "Man with the Movie Camera" by Dziga Vertov.
- Soundtrack for the movie "Invisible Battalion."
- Soundtrack for the movie "Man and Monkey" by Andriy Vinnytsky.
- Soundtrack for the movie "Dnieper in Concrete."
- "Prayer," "At the Bottom," "Maze," "Birds," and "Galenka."
- "Monika."
- "Dnipro" (single with music video by Svetlana Reinish).

== Albums ==
- "Black Period" (2018) is the duo's first studio mini-album dedicated to space themes; it is a musical fantasy on the theme of the big bang theory. It includes 4 tracks: Black Period (1), Object (2), Monika (3), Encounter (4). The title track was written for the exhibition of the same name by artist Oleksa Mann. It was recognized as the mini-album of the year by COMMA.
