= He Fucked the Girl Out of Me =

2022 video game

- Developer: Taylor McCue
- Programmer: Sopheria Rose
- Artist: Kimberly Karlsson
- Engine: GB Studio
- Platform: Game Boy
- Release: 21 May 2022
- Genre: Interactive fiction
- Mode: Single-player

He Fucked the Girl Out of Me is a 2022 video game by independent developer Taylor McCue. The game is an interactive fiction title that explores the creator's personal experiences with transgender identity, sex work, and trauma through Ann, the player character, who is convinced to enter sex work by her partner, Sally. McCue stated that the game was semi-autobiographical and dealt with a mixture of personal experiences that were confronting to translate into a game. Upon release, He Fucked the Girl out of Me received praise and discussion from reviewers, who resonated with the game's personal themes and the mature handling of its subject matter. Following release, the game received the Award for Digital Storytelling at the International Documentary Film Festival Amsterdam in 2022, and was nominated for a Nuovo Award at the Independent Games Festival in 2023.

== Gameplay ==
GB Studio software was used to create a Game Boy game.

He Fucked the Girl Out of Me is an interactive fiction game that narrates a linear set of scenes depicting the memories of the player character. In some stages, the player can use the keyboard and directional keys to move the character around and progress dialogue. The choice to display trigger warnings is discussed at the start of the game to identify sensitive themes.

== Plot ==
The game is narrated by Ann, who recounts her traumatic experiences with sex work, although cautions the player that they only wish to share their own experience and not comment on others. Ann is a transgender woman who is struggling financially as a college student as they attempt to fund a prescription of estradiol that is not subsidized under the Affordable Care Act. Ann's friend Sally introduces her to sex work as a means to make money. Ann's first client invites her back to his house. The man takes Ann to a private room, containing a box of women's clothing. He reveals that he is a cross-dresser and makes Ann dress him in the clothing to become a woman. Ann enters a state of dissociation during the encounter, reasoning that the client only wishes to be dressed as a woman to be humiliated and degraded. After the encounter, Ann navigates feelings of emptiness.

Re-reading her diary entries from that time, Ann encounters the line "He fucked the girl out of me", reflecting that the experience degraded her, made her hate herself and her feminine identity, and led her to see self-worth and value only in terms of sex. Ann says that the experience affected their trust in relationships with others and fear of damaging their relationship with their mother and Sally. Ann confronts Sally's suggestion to lead her into sex work, stating it "felt like rape", and decides to leave Sally after she downplays its effects on Ann. In an epilogue set years after the events of the incident, Ann examines objects in a box, including clothes from her time doing sex work, and throws them away. She confronts her past self and challenges her thoughts that hiding and failing to accept herself are not the ways to process what happened.

== Development and release ==
He Fucked the Girl Out of Me was created by Taylor McCue, a transgender independent developer based in the Southern United States. McCue provided most of the game's art and code, with supporting art by Kimberly Karlsson and programming by Sopheria Rose. McCue developed the game to depict their own experiences to be "understood and accepted as a person", exploring themes involving mental health, transgender identity and sex work, although found the experience of creating the game personally difficult and confronting. The game was made as an vignette of "tiny details" important to McCue, who aimed to introduce interactive elements to make players more able to identify with the player character rather than read the text as detached or passive observers. McCue originally created the game using Twine, then moved to GB Studio, a game creation system for developing games on the Game Boy.

He Fucked The Girl Out of Me was released by McCue on itch.io in May 2022. As GB Studio can compile a Game Boy-compatible ROM image, the game received a limited release of physical cartridges made from repurposed bootleg Game Boy games sold by the developer at the Toronto Comic Arts Festival in April 2023. In June 2023, McCue included the game in a Queer Games Bundle co-ordinated by McCue and Nilson Carroll on the itch.io platform, packaged with other games intended to support independent queer developers. A digital re-release on Steam followed in July 2023.

== Reception ==
Sisi Jiang of Kotaku described the game as being about "all the ways in which American society fails its most vulnerable", finding it to be "terrifying because of its mundanity". Smangaliso Simelane of Destructoid considered the game's narrative was "profoundly personal" and "uncomfortably invasive", finding its "freedom to breach topics and express viewpoints seldom interrogated by the mainstream", including sex work, shame and trauma. Also writing for Destructoid, Zoey Handley felt the game was both "important and difficult to talk about", noting that whilst it was confronting to the author, it could help the player understand trauma, praising the game's non-judgmental perspective on its themes. Describing the game as one of the best indie games of 2023, and "one of the greatest arguments for the worth and potential of the medium", Willa Rowe of Inverse found the game to be emotionally resonant, focusing on its "unforgettable" and "unflinching" treatment of its subject matter. Discussing games that explore trauma for Game Developer, independent developer Nathalie Lawhead stated that He Fucked the Girl Out of Me was "iconically defiant" and "speaks to the power of vulnerability" in spite of its simplicity. Andrew King of TheGamer similarly found the game had "minimal graphical flair", but used its art style to "tell an emotionally raw and absorbing story", expressing that people who had faced similar experiences would identify with Ann's story.

He Fucked the Girl Out of Me was nominated for a Nuovo Award at the 2023 Independent Games Festival. The game appeared at the International Documentary Film Festival Amsterdam 2022, where it received the DFA DocLab Award for Digital Storytelling and assessed as "a unique approach to conveying a complicated personal history in the artist's own terms". The game also received the jury award at the 2022 Melbourne Queer Games Festival, and a nomination for the Narrative Spotlight Award at the 2023 IndieCade Festival.

The game was deindexed from itch.io on 24 July 2025, the same day Itch announced they were deindexing from their search games marked NSFW due to action by Collective Shout and some payment processors against Steam and Itch.
