= Melbourne Queer Games Festival =

Annual LGBT festival in Australia

- MQGF 2018 banner
- Genre: LGBTIQ+ Game Festival
- Location: Melbourne, Australia
- Years active: 7
- Founded: 2018
- Website: mqgf.com.au

The Melbourne Queer Games Festival is an annual LGBT game festival held in Melbourne, Victoria, Australia. It was founded in 2018 and is held in October as a part of the Melbourne International Games Week. It showcases video and tabletop games from around the world that feature LGBT gameplay elements

The festival is volunteer led and in addition to appealing to the queer gaming community and raise the profile of queer games, they're working toward reclaiming the phrase "gay games".

== Format ==
The festival publishes a showcase of games submitted, a livestream of games being played, and a series of juried awards and launched with fifty games in its inaugural year. In 2018 it ran a "Bring It Back" event highlighting an older game, Lesbian Spider-Queens of Mars.

== Jury-voted awards ==
The Festival recognizes several categories of awards: technical, jury, bronze, silver and gold.

Awards and nominations at the Melbourne Queer Games Festival
Year	Work	Author	Award
2024	Queer Quest: All in a Gay's Work	Queermo Games	Gold Medal
2024	Kitsune Tails	Eniko Fox, James Yarrow, Allison Shabet, Elizabeth Dumler	Silver Medal
2024	Walk With Me	Ray Chia	Bronze Medal
2024	Incolatus	Jane Fiona	Technical Achievement Award
2024	pareidolia in █▄██▄▄	wren773tk	Emerging Developer Award
2023	Please Be Happy	Arimia	Gold Medal
2023	Funny Walk – You're So Tense!!	Vi	Silver Medal
2023	two men go on a date and don't fall in love	littlerat	Bronze Medal
2023	It Started With Hairs	SuperBiasedGary	Bronze Medal
2023	Sporal	Mimosa Echard	Technical Achievement Award
2022	talking to my dad	Hatim Benhsain	Gold Medal
2022	TAIPEI METRO QUEST	Dri Chiu Tattersfield	Silver Medal
2022	Angel!	Cathy Trang and Sean Wejebe	Bronze Medal
2022	Buy Hyacinths	Benjamilian Swithen, Cow Children Games	Bronze Medal
2022	He Fucked the Girl Out of Me	Taylor McCue	Jury Award
2022	Queer and Chill	Ignacio Bustos	Technical Achievement Award
2022	Autumn Wish	Violet Fairy	Emerging Developer Award
2021	Winter	Freya Campbell and Elliot Herriman	Gold Award
2021	Cover Me In Leaves	Elliot Herriman	Silver Medal
2021	What's your gender?	radow	Bronze Medal
2021	Minotaur Hotel	MinoAnon	Bronze Medal
2021	Tong Jyun	kc	Technical Achievement Award
2021	Parcels and Pollen	Littlerat	Emerging Developer Award
2020	If Found...	Llaura McGree	Gold Medal
2020	spring leaves no flowers	kc	Silver Medal
2020	Queering Spacetime	Toto Lin	Bronze Medal
2020	Monster Sweethearts	Sam	Bronze Medal
2020	Queer Olympix Day 1 - Comsmic Room	Lezborado	Jury Award
2019	Arcade Spirits	Stefan Gagne	Gold Medal
2019	Grunge	Chloe Spencer	Silver Medal
2019	Play Possum	Niamh Noble	Bronze Medal
2019	Pact	Tim Snowdon	Technical Achievement Award
2018	Strange Flesh	Greatest Bear	Gold Award
2018	Saving You From Yourself	Taylor McCue	Silver Award
2018	Love on the Peacock Express	trainmilfsgame	Bronze Award
2018	Genderwrecked	Ryan Rose Aceae, Heather Robinson, Medley Baxter	Jury Award
2018	All Walls Must Fall	inbetweengames	Technical Achievement Award
