= The Other Side of Burka =

The Other Side of Burka (Az Pase Borghe)
- Directed by: Mehrdad Oskouei
- Written by: Mehrdad Oskouei
- Produced by: Mehrdad Oskouei
- Starring: Katayoon Shahabi (SMI)
- Cinematography: Ebrahim Saeedi, Mehrdad Oskouei
- Edited by: Ebrahim Saeedi
- Music by: Ali Samadpour
- Distributed by: Sheherazad Media International (SMI), Katayoon Shahabi
- Release date: 2004
- Running time: 52 min
- Country: Iran
- Language: Persian

The Other Side of Burka is a 2004 Iranian documentary directed by Mehrdad Oskouei. In the southern island of Qeshm, Iran, which is a very strict region in point of tradition and African-Arabic rules, all women are under the pressure of patriarch society. Their sufferance is manifested by different mental (Zar, Possession) and physical diseases which must be only treated by Zar Ceremony. For the first time, despite the danger these women face, this film tells us the sad story of their life and shows their confection in front of the camera. It tries to be an honest mirror that reflects their sufferance and unveils their Burka to reveal their real characters.
