= Divorce Iranian Style =

- Directed by: Kim Longinotto; Ziba Mir-Hosseini
- Written by: Ziba Mir-Hosseini
- Release date: August 1998 (UK)
- Countries: Iran; United Kingdom
- Language: Persian

Divorce Iranian Style is a 1998 documentary film directed by Kim Longinotto and Ziba Mir-Hosseini which chronicles the legal battles of three Iranian couples as they seek divorce in the Iranian court system. The film documents three couples as they go through the various legal processes and cultural barriers as they seek to file for divorce and highlights the poignant differences of men and women in the court system. The film also shows the complexity of blending religious law with a state run court system.

== Gender differences ==
One of the key elements this film documents is the dichotomy between men and women in the eyes of the Iranian court. From the start of the film this becomes clear as the documentary shows the two entrances for men and women as they enter the courthouse. As the men enter they are searched for weapons and cell phones, and as the women enter they are examined to ensure they are dressed according to Islamic standards and guidelines. As the men and women stand before the judge and argue their case the differences between the men and women become even more readily apparent. While the women often plead their cases vigorously, alleging everything from infidelity to domestic abuse, they are almost constantly reminded that divorce is greatly frowned upon by Islam, and told that if they would try harder at home (i.e. wear makeup around the house, make themselves more attractive, show more respect for their husbands) many of the allegations would resolve themselves.

As the documentary progresses, the filmmakers note the differences in legal rights Islamic men and women have when asking for a divorce. In most cases, only men are allowed to seek a divorce unless other circumstances exist such as the man not being able to provide the woman with a child. As more of the rights of men and women are explained the discrepancies become more clear. For instance, should a man seek to divorce his wife he is liable to nothing more other than paying court sanctioned compensation to his wife. However, should the woman seek the divorce she likely will forfeit much if not all of her "marriage gift" (monetary compensation) and will likely deal with the cultural shame and stigma of being divorced. Furthermore, the film address the issue of child custody and once again highlights the differences between men and women. Should the divorce be finalized and the woman remarries, she automatically forfeits custody of her children and they are returned to her husband. Over and over again, the film seems to show how the law and the court system are established in such a way to favor the rights of men over women.

== Blending religious and state law ==
Beyond highlighting the differences in the rights of men and women in the court, the film also shows the complexities which occur as the Iranian state attempts to blend Sharia law and secular state law. Time and again the Muslim Qadi presiding over the cases will remind those before him of how Islam detests divorce and encourages them to reconcile. Even beyond his religious council, the documentary also shows the Qadi's willingness to impose Islamic punishment such as reminding one man he can receive 70 lashes for referring to his wife as a "loose woman" in public, but also reminds the wife she must provide four witnesses before such a punishment can be handed down.

However, even while it is clear that Islamic law is used and imposed it the film also shows how the Iranian court is willing to combine secular state law as well. This is especially true in terms of the court issuing orders for medical tests to be performed to determine if facts presented in a case are true before rendering a verdict. It also clear that along with the religious elements which are in place, the Iranian court has a well established state run bureaucracy within the court. There are clear procedures in place and a litany of papers which must be filed with the correct departments with the proper signatures included.

It is this blending of religious and state law which allows for the judges to have a great deal of leeway in making rulings and issuing mandates to those coming before the court. Often, before issuing any ruling or allowing the divorce to take place, the Qadi attempts to resolve the issue through arbitration and then decides himself if the arbitration was effective and if the couple should be able to reconcile.

== Reception ==
On Metacritic, which uses a weighted average, assigned the film a score of 73 out of 100, based on 8 critics, indicating "generally favorable" reviews.

== Legacy ==
The title of the 2005 documentary Nose, Iranian Style is a homage to Divorce, Iranian Style. The title of the 2015 docu-Fictie Dance, Iranian Style is a homage to Divorce, Iranian Style.
