= The Last Days of Winter (film) =

- Directed by: Mehrdad Oskouei
- Written by: Mehrdad Oskouei
- Produced by: Mehrdad Oskouei, Oskouei Film Production
- Cinematography: Ashkan Ashkani
- Edited by: Farid Daghagheleh
- Music by: Morteza Saedi
- Distributed by: Cinema Guild
- Release date: 16 February 2011
- Running time: 52min
- Country: Iran
- Language: Persian

The Last Days of Winter is a 2011 Iranian documentary directed by Mehrdad Oskouei.

== Production ==
It took Oskouei four years to obtain the permit necessary to make the documentary, and he only had 12 days to actually film.

== Festivals ==
- 24th IDFA, International Documentary Film Festival Amsterdam 2011, The Netherlands. « Reflecting Images: Panorama & DOC U section ».
- International Documentary Edge Film Festival, Auckland and Wellington, New Zealand, 2012
- Middle East Now Film Festival, Florence, Italy, 2012
- 7th International Oriental Film Festival in Geneva, Switzerland, 2012.
- 11th Documentary Film Festival in Lasalle – Cévennes, France, 2012
- 6th Filem’on, International Children's Film Festival, Brussels, Belgium. 2012
- 12th "Escales Documentaires", La Rochelle, France, 2012.
- Documentary Film Month at the ancient chapel of the Abbey of Aniane, France, 2012
- 21st "Traces de Vies" Festival, Clermont Ferrand, France, 2012.
- Black Movie Film Festival, Geneva, Switzerland, 2013
- Atmosphères 53, 5ème Festival du Film Judiciaire de Laval, France, 2013
- 3ème Festival Documentaire "Enfance dans le monde", Paris, France, 2013.
- 3rd Prague, Iranian Film Festival, Czech Republic. 8–12 January 2014
- 13th True/False Film Festival, Columbia, Missouri, US. 3–6 March 2016.

== Awards ==
- Winner of Blackberry IDFA Doc U Award 2011
- Winner of Golden FIFOG for best documentary at the 7th International Oriental Film Festival in Geneva, 2012.
- Winner of Youth Selection Award at the 12th Escales Documentaires, La Rochelle, France, 2012.
- Winner of Jury's Special Mention at the 22nd Traces de Vies International Documentary Film Festival, France 2012.

== Reviews ==
Taylor Wanbaugh of VOX Magazine called The Last Days of Winter "a fantastic examination of the human spirit." He added, "It’s easy to forget where these boys are and all they’ve had to go through in their short lives, but their big brown eyes tell the tales of their sadness."
