= David Meskhi =

Georgian photographer (born 1979)

David Meskhi (born 1979) is a photographer based in Berlin, Germany.

== Early life and education ==
Meskhi was born in 1979 in Tbilisi, Georgia.

After gaining a master's degree in hydro ecology, he decided to change his profession entirely and turned to art. He received an academic degree in photojournalism from the Shota Rustaveli Theatre and Film State University in Tbilisi.

== Career ==
Since 2004, Meskhi has been working as a photographer and photojournalist for several magazines, and his artwork has been exhibited in Austria, France, Georgia, Germany, Israel, Russia and the United Kingdom.

In 2008, Meskhi was invited to photograph the Georgian Olympic team.

Between 2013 and 2015, he co-directed a documentary When the Earth Seems to Be Light with Salome Machaidze and Tamuna Karumidze, which is based on his photographs.
