= Bettina Haasen =

German communication scientist and film director

Dr. Bettina Haasen (born 1969) is a German communication scientist and film director. She studied African Languages and Political Sciences and completed her PhD in 2018. She worked in the field of conflict transformation and media in West Africa and The Great Lakes Region (Burundi, Rwanda, DRC) until 2014. Since 2018 she is senior consultant at Synchronize-Consult in strategy-led transformation processes focusing on purpose, vision, organizational development and storytelling. Also a lecturer at the Academy for International Cooperation.

== Education and work experience ==
- Studied at University of Hamburg (1992–1997) MA in Political Science and African Studies Institute of Oriental and African Languages (INALCO)
  - ERASMUS Grant for studies at INALCO (1994–1995)
  - Political Scientist / Graduation of Magistra Artium (2003–2008) focusing on African Languages (African writing systems) and International Relations
- Worked for EGOLI Films GmbH in Berlin, Germany (1997–2000) responsible for documentary and fiction film production.
- Independent filmmaker and producer of documentary films reflecting on societal issues
  - “Hotel Sahara” (2008) feature-length documentary about inner-African migration ”My life –Irene Dische” (2007) about the German- American writer; “Shadows of the desert” (2006) on Niger’s salt caravan; “Sisters of a long night/ A Love Apart” (2004) on a woman's marriage in a Tuareg community. “Between two worlds “ (1999), ethnographical road movie on Wodaabe tribe.
- Technical Advisor/Program Coordinator for DED (Deutscher Entwicklungsdienst) (2001–2004)
  - Researching on conflict analysis and management of scarce natural resources by different nomad populations in the Azawak region of Northern Niger.
  - Implementing platforms and round tables on conflict sensitive issues (national resources).
- Peace and Conflict Consultant graduated from Institut für Konflikttransformation in 2010 Worked for EIRENE International for Media and Conflict resolution (2011- 2014)
  - Implemented a regional conflict sensitive media program (financed by the Swiss Cooperation Office SDC) implicating three regional radio stations with the aim to support the practical training of local journalists and the production of quality information in order to facilitate the rapprochement and mutual understanding among the conflicting parties of the region
  - Organized an international Peace and Media conference in Bonn, Germany
  - Elaborating project proposals / Coordination of the peace building project “caravane de communication” using participatory theatre followed by debriefing-sessions in 4 communities (2012) funded by the Ministry of Foreign Affairs of Germany and the institute IFA / ZIVIK (2012)
  - Worked closely with the local administration, local leaders, other NGOs and counterparts.
- Teacher (2004–2010) teaching African emerging Filmmakers (Documentary Writing, Fundraising etc.) working as a freelance consultant for the Goethe Institute in Yaoundé, Cameroon
- PhD studies (2014–2018) at Ruhr University Bochum in Media Studies at School of International and Intercultural Communication (SIIC)
  - Traveled to Burundi for her doctoral thesis in 2015 to research the role of journalists in the context of the controversial local and parliamentary elections. The aim of the doctoral thesis was originally to examine a Western-style theory of the French sociologist Pierre Bourdieu in an African context but got stuck in a military coup, during the Burundian unrest
  - In September 2018, she published her book, Journalismus in Burundi: Erfahrungswelten in Konflikt und Transformation.
- Lecturer at the Academy for International Cooperation in Bonn, Germany.

== Documentary films ==
Year	Film	Type	Role
2008	24h Berlin - A Day in the Life	Documentary	director and research manager
2008	Hotel Sahara - Die Suche nach dem Paradies (TT)	Documentary, arte, ZDF [de]	director
2007	My Life - Irene Dische	Documentary (collection)	director
2006	Nomaden - Schatten der Wüste (Nomads- Shadows of the desert)	Documentary (collection), arte, SWR [de]	director
2004	A Love Apart / Sisters of a long night	Documentary, 3sat	director
1999	Zwischen 2 Welten(Between two Worlds)	Documentary	director
