= Unforgivable (2020 film) =

2020 El Salvadoran short documentary film

- Film Poster
- Directed by: Marlén Viñayo
- Screenplay by: Carlos Martínez; Marlén Viñayo
- Produced by: Carlos Martínez; Marlén Viñayo
- Cinematography: Neil Brandvold
- Edited by: Andrea Bilbao
- Release dates: May 28, 2020 (Hot Docs); November 23, 2020 (IDFA)
- Running time: 35 minutes
- Country: El Salvador
- Language: Spanish

Unforgivable is a 2020 El Salvador short documentary film directed by Marlén Viñayo. It was the first Salvadoran film to qualify to compete for an Academy Awards nomination.

== Summary ==
A ruthless hitman for the 18th Street gang serves his sentence inside an evangelical Salvadoran prison, where he is guilty not only of his crimes, but of an unforgivable sin under God and gang: being gay.

== Cast ==
- Geovanny as himself

== Release ==
The film had its world premiere at Hot Docs in the Nightvision Shorts Program: Pleasure Prison in May 2020. In November 2020, the film had its European premiere at IDFA.

== Reception ==
In October 2020, Unforgivable was shortlisted by the International Documentary Association as one of the best short films of 2020.

== Accolades ==
Award	Year	Category	Result	Ref.
Hot Docs	2020	Best International Short Documentary	Won	
IDFA	2020	Best Short Documentary	Won	
Palm Springs ShortFest	2020	Best of the Festival	Won	
Slamdance Film Festival	2020	Grand Jury Prize	Won	
