= Autumn Gold =

2010 film

- Herbstgold
- Directed by: Jan Tenhaven
- Written by: Jan Tenhaven
- Produced by: Christian Beetz
- Starring: Alfred Proksch; Gabre Gabric-Calvesi
- Cinematography: Martin Langer; Marcus Winterbauer
- Edited by: Jürgen Winkelblech
- Music by: Andy Baum
- Distributed by: Cinema Delicatessen
- Release dates: 4 May 2010 (Canada); 8 July 2010 (Germany)
- Running time: 94 minutes
- Country: Germany
- Language: German

Autumn Gold (German: Herbstgold) is a 2010 German documentary film directed by Jan Tenhaven. The film is about senior athletes competing at the Worlds Masters Championships.

== Cast ==
- Alfred Proksch as himself
- Gabre Gabric-Calvesi as herself
- Herbert Liedtke as himself
- Ilse Pleuger as herself
- Jiří Soukup as himself
