= Kurds in Ukraine =

Part of the historically significant Kurdish population in the post-Soviet space

Kurds in Ukraine Курди в Україні Kurdên Ûkraynayê
Total population
- 2,088 (2001 census)–25,000 (2004 estimation)

Regions with significant populations
- Crimea, Luhansk Oblast, Kherson Oblast, Kyiv Oblast, Kyiv

Languages
- Kurdish (Kurmanji), Ukrainian, Russian

Religion
- Islam, Yezidism

The Kurds in Ukraine (Ukrainian: Курди в Україні, romanized: Kurdy v Ukrayini; Kurdish: Kurdên Ûkraynayê) form a part of the historically significant Kurdish population in the post-Soviet space, and are located mainly in the southern and eastern parts of the country. They descend from migrants and refugees from the Caucasus (Armenia, Azerbaijan, and Georgia) and have had a presence in Ukraine since the early 20th century.

== History ==
The sharp population rise from 1989 to 2001, where the Kurdish population augmented from 238 to 2,088 was caused by the Spitak earthquake which shook the Kurdish areas of Armenia in 1988. Furthermore, the fall of the Soviet Union facilitated the migration of Kurds from the former Soviet Union to Ukraine. Most of these Kurds were from the Yezidi minority. Another wave of refugees came to Ukraine as a consequence of the first Nagorno-Karabakh War in 1993, which occurred in the region which was historically known as Red Kurdistan. This wave of migration included both Muslim and Yezidi Kurds.

Census results
- Year: Kurdish Population
1897	0
1926	16^{1}
1939	90^{1}
1959	65
1970	117
1979	122
1989	238
2001	2,088
- ^{1}Note: Includes Crimea which became part of Ukraine in 1954.

Kurds in oblasts of Ukraine by population (2001)

== Language ==
In the 1989 Soviet Census, out of the 238 ethnic Kurds in Ukraine, 132 of them (55.5%) had Kurdish as first language, while 77 (32.3%) had Russian and 13 (5.5%) had Ukrainian. The numbers for Kurdish and Ukrainian rose to 56% and 11% respectively in 2001.
