= No Obvious Signs =

2018 Ukrainian documentary film

- Ukrainian: Явних проявів немає
- Directed by: Alina Gorlova
- Screenplay by: Alina Gorlova
- Produced by: Alina Gorlova; Maria Berlinska
- Cinematography: Oleksyi Kuchma
- Edited by: Alina Gorlova
- Music by: Ptakh Jung
- Production company: Tabor Production
- Distributed by: Filmotor
- Release date: 25 March 2018
- Running time: 1 hour, 4 minutes
- Country: Ukraine
- Language: Russian

No Obvious Signs (Ukrainian: «Явних проявів немає») is a 2018 Ukrainian documentary by Ukrainian director Alina Gorlova. It is a Russian-language Ukrainian film produced by Gorlova and Ukrainian producer Maria Berlinska. The film follows Ukrainian Army major Oksana Yakubova as she struggles with post-traumatic stress disorder (PTSD).

== Accolades ==
No Obvious Signs was named the "Outstanding Eastern European Film" at the 2018 Dok Leipzig film festival.

The film was included on a list of the 100 best Ukrainian films by the National Oleksandr Dovzhenko Film Centre.
