= Unforgivable (video series) =

2006 YouTube comedy video series

Unforgivable is an American online comedy video series associated with HodgeStansson Productions and the early years of YouTube. The series features Gunnar Stansson performing aggressive, profane comic monologues, usually filmed by Logan W. Hodge in a low-budget handheld style.

The videos became popular during YouTube's early period as a viral video platform. In 2007, Virginia Heffernan of The New York Times described Unforgivable as a major YouTube comedy hit and wrote that the first four videos in the series had each received more than one million views on YouTube. In 2020, Thrillist ranked "unforgivable #1" at number 37 on its list of the 100 greatest YouTube videos of all time, describing the ten-video series as influential within early YouTube culture.

== Background and production ==
The first Unforgivable video was uploaded to YouTube in August 2006. It features Stansson delivering an exaggerated monologue about a date at a mall, ending with the title phrase "unforgivable". The video was shot in a wooded area and presents Stansson in a hostile comic persona while Hodge can be heard laughing behind the camera.

Know Your Meme describes the series as a ten-part short-film series directed by L. W. Hodge, with Stansson performing "humorous, disturbing and expletive-ridden anecdotes" in an aggressive tone. The series is associated with the Hodge Stansson YouTube channel, where later entries and related HodgeStansson Productions videos were uploaded.

== Style and content ==
Unforgivable is built around extended monologues rather than conventional sketch comedy structure. The videos use intentionally offensive language, including misogynistic and racist slurs, as part of an exaggerated character performance. Heffernan discussed the first video as not safe for work and treated its humor as a form of satirical performance rather than a literal statement of the views expressed by the character.

Thrillist later described the first video as problematic in the manner of many early internet videos created by young users, while also arguing that the influence of the ten-video series was real.

== Reception ==
In The New York Times, Heffernan wrote that the best of the Unforgivable videos were "truly, deeply, scarily hilarious" and described the series as a major hit among young online viewers. She reported that the first four videos in the series had each passed one million views on YouTube by June 2007.

Know Your Meme describes Unforgivable as a confirmed viral-video series and documents its spread through sequels, reuploads, and parody reenactments.

== Later coverage and legacy ==
In 2008, Heffernan revisited Hodge-Stansson in The New York Times, describing them as YouTube filmmakers and noting that the Unforgivable series had inspired many video responses. The same article stated that Hodge had later worked under the name North American Kino Eye and that he and Stansson had released a restored version of their short film The Butler on YouTube.

In 2020, Thrillist included "unforgivable #1" on its list of the 100 greatest YouTube videos of all time. The article ranked the video at number 37 and stated that Stansson's monologues had spread widely and inspired male and female imitators on YouTube.

== See also ==
- Internet meme
- List of Internet phenomena
