= Interesting Times: The Secret of My Success =

- Lin qi da she tou
- Directed by: Duan Jinchuan
- Produced by: Mark Frith; Jacqueline Elfick
- Cinematography: Jinchuan Duan
- Edited by: Jinchuan Duan
- Production company: Decameron Films
- Release date: 2002
- Running time: 59 minutes
- Country: China
- Language: Chinese

Interesting Times: The Secret of My Success is a 2002 Chinese documentary film by director Duan Jinchuan about China's contemporary politics of democracy and the realities of the one child policy. The director shows how this policy is being implemented in Fanshen, a rural village in Northeast China.

This film is part of the 2002 series 'Interesting Times' showing different aspects of modern life in China:

- The secret of my success - shows how Chinese politics are implemented in the countryside.
- The war of love Directors: Duan Jinchuan & Jiang Yue - is a portrait of a marriage broker.
- Xiao’s long march Director: Wu Gong - about the People's Liberation Army.
- This happy life Director: Jiang Yue - aims to define the concept of political education in China.

== Awards ==
IDFA Award for best Mid-Length Documentary (2002)
