= Alina Gorlova =

Ukrainian filmmaker

- Алі́на Едуа́рдівна Го́рлова
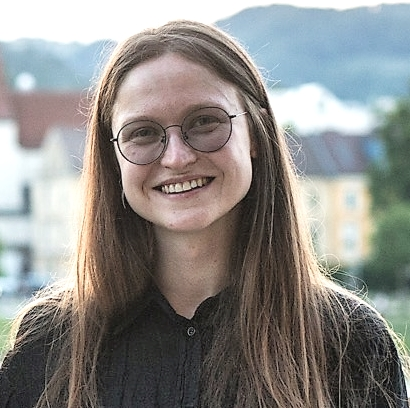
- Gorlova at Crossing Europe Film Festival in 2021
- Born: 1992 (age 33–34); Zaporizhzhia
- Education: Kyiv National I. K. Karpenko-Kary Theatre, Cinema and Television University
- Occupation: Filmmaker

Alina Eduardivna Gorlova (Ukrainian: Алі́на Едуа́рдівна Го́рлова; b. 1992) is a Ukrainian filmmaker, director, and screenwriter, specialising in documentaries. She was inducted into the Ukrainian Film Academy in 2017 and was named as an Honored Artist of Ukraine in 2021.

== Education ==
Gorlova studied at the Kyiv National I. K. Karpenko-Kary Theatre, Cinema and Television University from 2008 to 2012.

== Filmography ==
- 2012: The First Step in the Clouds
- 2014: Babushka
- 2016: Kholodny Yar. Intro
- 2017: Invisible Battalion, documentary, co-directed with Iryna Tsilyk and Svetlana Lishchynska
- 2018: No Obvious Signs, documentary (with score by Ptakh Jung)
- 2020: This Rain Will Never Stop, documentary

== Recognition ==
2013 – The Fourth International Festival of Author's Cinema "Cine-lyceum" in Barnaul: Silver Jean-Luc "Power of the Word" for Best Story.

2018 – The film "There Are No Visible Signs" was awarded the "Outstanding Eastern European Film" prize by the jury of the MDR-Mitteldeutscher Rundfunk channel at the DOK Leipzig International Documentary Film Festival.

2020 – The film "This Rain Will Never Stop" by producer Maxym Nakonechnyi and director Alina Gorlova won the Best Feature-length Film award at the Festival dei Popoli in Florence.

2021 – The film "This Rain Will Never Stop" won the award for Best Cinematic Documentary at the 66th Cork International Film Festival, Ireland.
