= Communications and Cybersecurity Troops =

- Війська зв’язку та кібербезпеки
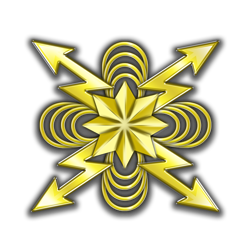
- Active: 1911–present
- Country: Ukraine
- Role: signals intelligence and cyberwarfare
- Part of: Armed Forces of Ukraine
- Headquarters: Kyiv
- Motto: Ніхто без нас ("Nobody without us")

Commanders
- Current commander: Oleksiy Kovalenko

Insignia
- Shoulder sleeve insignia

The Communications and Cybersecurity Troops (Війська зв’язку та кібербезпеки, Viysʹka zvʺyazku ta kiberbezpeky) is a branch of the Armed Forces of Ukraine. They are specialised forces of the Armed Forces of Ukraine, designed to ensure the functioning of the communications and information systems, combat control and alert systems, as well as the national cybersecurity system of Ukraine.

Signal troops include nodal and linear connections, parts of the technical support of communications, automated control systems, and courier and postal services.

== History ==
=== During the Hetmanate ===
During the Hetmanate, the General Staff's communications department was for some time a subdivision of the 1st Quartermaster General's Office. However, by the end of 1918, this body had again become a separate department. Each army corps had 4 radiotelegraph companies; the Grey Division had 3 communications platoons (1 for each kuren) in each of its regiments (of which there were 4), subordinate to the chief of communications of the regiment.

Documents and exhibits of the Central Museum of the Armed Forces of Ukraine in Kyiv indicate that by 1920, Cossacks and foremen of the communications units of Ukrainian military units already had their own emblems (one of the attributes of the branch of the army), and separate ones for telegraphists and radiotelegraphists. The Red Army did not give its signalmen separate insignia until 1922 .

In November 1917, the General Staff of the UNR Army included a communications department, which existed both during the Hetmanate of P. Skoropadsky and during the Directory of the UNR. The communications department, together with the General Staff, was interned in 1921 in Poland, where it continued its work in exile.

That is, in the Ukrainian General Staff, the communications management body was created a full 2 years earlier than the similar formation in the Red Army.

=== During the Soviet Union ===
Mass training of command personnel for the signal troops began on March 27, 1918. Signal commanders were trained at courses for Red commanders of engineering troops, opened on the basis of the former officer electrotechnical school in Petrograd. On October 20, 1919, a government order was issued, according to which the signal troops of the Armed Forces received centralized leadership and were reorganized into independent specialized troops.

On August 8, 1920, the training of signal cadets began at the Kyiv Engineering Courses.

Later, signal soldiers provided troop control in difficult mountainous conditions during hostilities in Afghanistan.

Signal units and divisions were also used to combat natural disasters and the consequences of disasters. Thus, in 1986, the day after the Chernobyl disaster, signal soldiers were already providing communications to rescue and recovery teams while in the affected area.

Over the years of its existence, about 600 signal units have been awarded state awards, more than 200 of them twice, 58 units have been awarded the title of Guards, about 200 units have been awarded honorary titles, 329 military signalmen have been awarded the title of Hero of the Soviet Union, 127 have become full holders of the Order of Glory, tens of thousands have been awarded orders and medals. Among the signalmen heroes are representatives of 22 nationalities, of which 48 are Ukrainians.

=== Following independence ===
On January 3, 1992, the Communications Directorate of the Red Banner Kyiv Military District took over the management of the system and communications troops of the Kyiv, Precarpathian, and Odessa Military Districts, and later the communications troops of the Air Force and Air Defense Forces. On January 4, the officers of the Communications Directorate swore allegiance to the people of Ukraine. This marked the beginning of the formation of the Communications Directorate of the General Staff of the Armed Forces in Independent Ukraine.

During the years of independence, the signal troops of the Armed Forces of Ukraine participated in all military training activities. At strategic, command and staff, special and research exercises, the signal troops performed tasks to ensure the control of units of the Armed Forces. Signal soldiers ensured the control of units of the Naval Forces during sea campaigns of Ukrainian ships, units of the Air Force during the performance of tasks by Ukrainian aircraft outside Ukraine.

The Ukrainian signal troops have gained extensive experience in providing communications with units of the Armed Forces of Ukraine as part of peacekeeping contingents and performing combat missions to maintain peace.

On November 10, 2017, during a briefing, the Chief of the Signal Corps of the Armed Forces of Ukraine - Head of the Main Directorate of Communications and Information Systems of the General Staff of the Armed Forces of Ukraine, Major General Volodymyr Rapko, announced that by 2020, all combat military units of the Armed Forces of Ukraine will be equipped with Aselsan radio stations. Individual military units and units will continue to use Harris radio stations received as part of the US military assistance program. Motorola radio stations will be used in operational support units.

In February 2020, in accordance with the reform of the military structures of the Armed Forces of Ukraine according to NATO standards, the Main Directorate of Communications and Information Systems of the General Staff of the Armed Forces of Ukraine was reorganized into the Command of the Signal and Cybersecurity Troops of the Armed Forces of Ukraine . Major General Yevhen Stepanenko was appointed commander.

From January 1, 2022, in accordance with the law "On the Fundamentals of National Resistance", the Signal and Cybersecurity Troops acquired the status of a separate branch of the military.

On October 9, 2025, a bill to establish a Cyber Forces, a separate branch dedicated to offensive cyberwarfare, was passed in first reading. Supporters of the bill distinguished the proposed Cyber Forces' offensive cyberwarfare from the Signals and Cybersecurity Troops' defensive cyber capabilities.

== Structure ==
=== Current composition ===
- Main control point of the communication and information systems of the Armed Forces of Ukraine A2666, Kyiv
- Main Security Control Center in Information and Telecommunications Systems of the Armed Forces of Ukraine A0334, Kyiv
- Main information and telecommunications hub A0351, Kyiv
- 3rd Separate Communications Brigade A0415, village of Semipolky, Brovary district, Kyiv region
- 1 field communication node of the General Staff, Kyiv
- 330th Central Node of the General Staff's FPD

==== Ground Forces ====
- 5th separate communications regiment A2995, Chernihiv
- 7th Separate Signal Regiment A3783, Odessa
- 8th Separate Signal Regiment A0707, Haisyn, Vinnytsia region
- 55th Separate Signal Regiment A1671, Rivne
- 121st Separate Signal Regiment A1214, Cherkaske village, Novomoskovsk district, Dnipropetrovsk region
- 64 information and telecommunications hub A1283, Odessa
- 346 information and telecommunications hub A1548, Rivne
- 367 information and telecommunications node A2984, Chernihiv
- 368 information and telecommunications hub A2326, Dnipro
- 315 courier and postal service node
- parts of courier and postal services

Air Force

- 31st Separate Communications and Radio Support Regiment named after Hetman Mykhailo Doroshenko A0799, Kyiv
- 43rd Separate Communications and Control Regiment A2171, Odessa
- 57th Separate Communications and Radio Support Regiment named after Hetman Ivan Sulima A3297, Dnipro
- 76th Separate Communications and Radio Support Regiment named after Vyacheslav Chornovil A2166, Lipnyky village, Lviv region
- 101st Separate Vinnytsia Communications and Radio Support Regiment A2656, Vinnytsia
- 182 united information and telecommunications hub A1660, Vinnytsia
- parts of courier and postal services

Naval Forces

- 37th Separate Signal Regiment A1942 (A4416), village of Radisne, Odessa district, Odessa region
- 68 unified information and telecommunications hub, Odessa
- 79 information and telecommunications hub A4362, Odessa

Airborne assault troops

- 347 information and telecommunications node A0876, Zhytomyr

== Equipment ==
- ZTK-1/S — portable satellite communication stations developed and manufactured by Datagroup .

== Leadership ==
Communications are managed by the Signal and Cybersecurity Forces Command of the Armed Forces of Ukraine .

=== Commanders ===
- 1992—1997: Lieutenant General Samoilenko Valentyn Ivanovych
- 1997—2001: Lieutenant General Volodymyr Oleksandrovych Ishchuk
- 2001—2004: Major General Semerych Yuri Petrovych
- 2004—2006: Major General Rudyk Volodymyr Volodymyrovych
- 2006—2010: Lieutenant General Malyarchuk Mykhailo Vasylovich
- 2010—2011: Major General Mishin Mykhailo Mykolayovych
- 2011—2014: Colonel Manzhos Anatoliy Volodymyrovych
- 2014—2019: Lieutenant General Volodymyr Vasylyovych Rapko
- 2020—2023: Major General Stepanenko Yevhen Oleksandrovych
- from 2023: Acting Brigadier General Kovalenko Oleksiy Oleksandrovych

== Educational institutions ==
- Military Institute of Telecommunications and Informatization named after Heroes Krut ;
- Military College of NCOs VITI
- 179th Joint Signal Troops Training Center

== Traditions ==
The professional holiday - August 8 - was established by the Decree of the President of Ukraine dated February 1, 2000.

== Public organization ==
- All-Ukrainian Association of Combatants and Veterans of Signal Troops
