= 57th Communications Regiment (Ukraine) =

57th Separate Communication and Radio Technical Support Regiment
- 57 Окремий полк зв'язку та радіотехнічного забезпечення імені гетьмана Івана Сулими
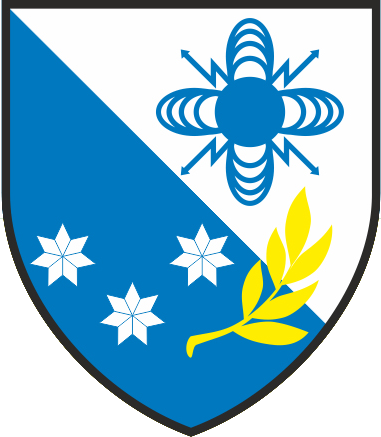
- Active: 1992 – present
- Country: Ukraine
- Allegiance: Armed Forces of Ukraine
- Branch: Ukrainian Air Force
- Type: Signal Corps
- Role: Communication
- Size: Regiment
- Part of: Air Command East
- Garrison/HQ: Dnipro, Dnipropetrovsk Oblast
- Nickname: Ivan Sulyma Brigade
- Patron: Hetman Ivan Sulyma
- Engagements: Russo-Ukrainian war: 2022 Russian invasion of Ukraine

Commanders
- Notable commanders: Colonel Ruslan Sokolsky

The 57th Separate Communication and Radio Technical Support Regiment named after Hetman Ivan Sulyma (MUN A3297) is a regiment of the Ukrainian Air Force tasked with providing command and communication facilities to the units of Air Command East. It is garrisoned in Dnipro. It is under the patronage of Dnipro State Administration and Dnipro City Council.

== History ==
Following the full-scale invasion, it saw action. On 26 February 2022, commander of the regiment, Colonel Sokolsky Ruslan Vasylovych of the regiment was killed by Russian airstrikes in Dnipro.

On 11 July 2024, the Return Alive Foundation donated pick-up trucks to the regiment.

On 4 August 2024, the 57th Communication Regiment was award the honorary name "Hetman Ivan Sulyma".

In January 2025, some specialist personnel from the regiment were to be transferred to perform infantry roles on the frontlines.

== Structure ==
- 57th Communications Regiment
  - Management and Headquarters
  - 1st Information and Telecommunications Battalion
    - Telecommunications Center
    - Automated Management Systems Center
    - Radio Broadcasting Center
    - Radio Reception Center
    - Classified Communications Center
  - 2nd Information and Telecommunications Battalion
    - Telecommunications Center
    - Automated Management Systems Center
    - Radio Broadcasting Center
    - Radio Reception Center
    - Classified Communications Center
  - Anti-aircraft Platoon
  - Commandant Platoon
  - Medical Center

== Commanders ==
- Colonel Sokolsky Ruslan Vasylovych † (?-2022)
