= Flags of the Ukrainian Armed Forces =

The several branches of the Armed Forces of Ukraine are represented by flags, among other emblems and insignia. Within each branch, various flags fly on various occasions, and on various ships, bases, camps, and military academies.

== Flags ==
| Flag | Name |
|---|---|
| | Flag of Ukraine |
| | Flag of the Ukrainian Armed Forces |

| Flag | Name |
|---|---|
| | Ukrainian Navy |
| | Ukrainian Ground Forces |
| | Ukrainian Air Force |
| | Special Operations Forces of Ukraine |
| | Ukrainian Air Assault Forces |
| | Ukrainian Marine Corps |

== Maritime flags ==
Many maritime flags have been used in Ukraine.

| Flag | Name |
|---|---|
| | Naval Jack |
| | Naval Ensign |
| | Sea Guard Ensign |
| | Pennant |
| | Sea Guard Pennant |
| | Red Cross for hospital ships |

== Personal flags ==
| Flag | Name |
|---|---|
| | Flag of the president of Ukraine |

| Flag | Name |
|---|---|
| | Standard of the Minister of Defense |

| Flag | Name |
|---|---|
| | Standard of the Chief of the General Staff |

| Flag | Name |
|---|---|
| | Standard of the Commander-in-Chief of Ukrainian Navy |
| | Standard of the Commander-in-Chief of Ukrainian Ground Forces |
| | Standard of the Commander-in-Chief of Ukrainian Air Force |

| Flag | Name |
|---|---|
| | Ukrainian Minister of Defence flag at sea |
| | Ukrainian Navy Commander's flag. |
| | Ukrainian Naval Region Commander's flag. |
| | Ukrainian Navy Ship Formation or Group flag. |
