= Cyber Forces (Ukraine) =

The Cyber Forces (Ukrainian: Кібервійська Збройних Сил України, Kiberviysʹka Zbroynykh Syl Ukrayiny) are a proposed branch of the Armed Forces of Ukraine dedicated to offensive cyberwarfare. On October 9, 2025, a bill to establish the Cyber Forces and Cyber Forces Command was passed by the Verkhovna Rada in first reading. Supporters of the bill distinguished the proposed Cyber Forces' offensive cyberwarfare from the Communications and Cybersecurity Troops' defensive cyber capabilities. Under the bill, the Main Directorate of Radio Electronic and Cyber Warfare of Ukraine's General Staff would be responsible for its establishment.

== See also ==
- IT Army of Ukraine
- Communications and Cybersecurity Troops
