= Armed Forces of Ukraine =

Combined military forces of Ukraine

Ukrainian Armed Forces
- Збройні сили України
- Ensign of the Armed Forces of Ukraine
- Founded: 29 March 1917; 109 years ago (as the Army of the Ukrainian People's Republic)
- Current form: 6 December 1991
- Service branches: Ground Forces; Marine Corps; Navy; Air Force; Air Assault Forces; Special Operations Forces; Unmanned Systems Forces; Territorial Defence Forces; Medical Forces; Support Forces; Logistics Forces; Communications and Cybersecurity Troops
- Headquarters: Ministry of Defence Building, Povitrianykh Syl Avenue, Kyiv
- Website: www.mil.gov.ua

Leadership
- Supreme Commander-in Chief: President Volodymyr Zelenskyy
- Acting Minister of Defence: Yevhenii Khmara
- Commander-in-Chief: Maj. Gen. Mykhailo Drapatyi
- Deputy Commander-in-Chief: Col. Artem Martynenko

Personnel
- Military age: 18 (routine male conscription only, excl. martial law period) (Note: participation in hostilities only from 25 years of age exclusively on a voluntary basis, from 2024)
- Conscription: 25 (minimum conscription age)
- Active personnel: 900,000 (2025)
- Reserve personnel: 4,000,000

Expenditure
- Budget: $120 billion (₴5 trillion (2026) foreign aid)
- Percent of GDP: 31.1% (2025)

Industry
- Domestic suppliers: Ukrainian Defense Industry
- Foreign suppliers: Current suppliers: Albania Argentina Australia Austria Azerbaijan Belgium Bosnia and Herzegovina Bulgaria Cambodia Canada Colombia Croatia Cyprus Czech Republic Denmark Estonia European Union Egypt Finland France Georgia Germany Greece Hungary Iceland India Ireland Israel Italy Japan Jordan Kenya Kosovo Latvia Liberia Lithuania Luxembourg Malta Moldova Montenegro Morocco NATO Netherlands New Zealand North Macedonia Norway Poland Portugal Romania Saudi Arabia Serbia Slovakia Slovenia South Korea Spain Sudan Sweden Switzerland Taiwan (Note: The official title is "Republic of China". See also List of states with limited recognition, Political status of Taiwan and Foreign relations of Taiwan.) Thailand Timor Leste Tunisia Turkey United Arab Emirates United Kingdom United States; Former suppliers: Belarus Russia

Related articles
- History: Russo-Ukrainian War (2014–present) War in Donbas (2014–2022): Battle of Artemivsk; Siege of Sloviansk; Battle of Kramatorsk; Battle of Mariupol; Battles of Sievierodonetsk; Battle of Karlivka; 1st Battle of Donetsk Airport; Siege of the Luhansk Border Base; Battle of Krasnyi Lyman; Zelenopillia rocket attack; Battle in Shakhtarsk Raion; Battle of Horlivka; Battle of Ilovaisk; Battle of Novoazovsk; Mariupol offensive; 2nd Battle of Donetsk Airport; Battle of Debaltseve; Shyrokyne standoff; Battle of Marinka; Battle of Svitlodarsk; Battle of Avdiivka; Russo-Ukrainian war (2022–): Northern Ukraine campaign; Eastern Ukraine campaign; Southern Ukraine campaign; Other
- Ranks: Military ranks of Ukraine

The Armed Forces of Ukraine (AFU; Ukrainian: Збройні сили України, romanised: Zbroini syly Ukrainy, pronounced [ˈzbrɔjn⁽ʲ⁾i ˈsɪlɪ ʊkrɐˈjinɪ]) are the military forces of Ukraine. They consist of the three branches: the Ground Forces, the Air Force and the Navy, and a number of separately organized forces and specialized support commands: the Air Assault Forces, the Marine Corps, the Special Operations Forces, the Unmanned Systems Forces, the Territorial Defence Forces, the Medical Forces, Support Forces, Logistics Forces and the Communications and Cybersecurity Troops. Ukraine's navy includes its own Naval Aviation, and the National Guard serves as a paramilitary reserve component of the Armed Forces. With a total strength of 4.9 million, the AFU is the fifth largest armed force in the world.

Military units of other countries have participated regularly in multinational military exercises in Ukraine, with many of these exercises being held under the NATO cooperation programme Partnership for Peace. Due to the ongoing Russo-Ukrainian war, the Ukrainian Armed Forces has been described as "the most battle-hardened in Europe".

According to the IISS, the AFU had the world's eighth largest defence budget in 2025. It operates one of the largest and most diverse drone fleets in the world. Its Soviet era military equipment is currently being replaced with NATO standard military equipment.

== History ==
The formation of the national armed forces in the modern sense dates back to the beginning of the twentieth century and coincides with the formation of the modern Ukrainian nation. In official history, this period is referred to as the "Ukrainian War of Independence" or the "First Liberation Struggle." This process coincided with the end of the First World War and the subsequent collapse of great European empires from previous centuries. The forerunner event was the creation of national military formations in the Imperial and Royal Armies of Austria-Hungary, namely the Legion of Ukrainian Sich Riflemen, on which Ukrainian paramilitary organisations in Galicia were based: Sich Sports and Fire Brigade, "Sokil" and the national scout organisation "Plast".

After the upheavals of World War I and on the verge of the collapse of empires, the Ukrainians tried again to return to sovereign statehood. As part of the growing disintegration in the ranks of the Russian Imperial Army, national units began to form. After the Bolshevik coup, hybrid warfare broke with the Russian Soviet Federative Socialist Republic and the White Guard. During the undeclared war, the Army of the Ukrainian People's Republic had already formed, but its formation was interrupted by the German administration. It continued in a limited form after the establishment of Hetman of Ukraine Pavlo Skoropadskyi's Ukrainian State, known as the [Second] Hetmanate. The national armed forces continued to develop. The Armed Forces of the Ukrainian state were planned in a more systematic way than in previous versions, although previous development was used in this process, and many mistakes were also made.

Uprisings against the Hetmanate's rule eventually resulted, and the reorientation of the Central Powers who lost in World War I against the Entente, which in turn supported the White Guard movement and the Russian Empire as its original ally.

Simultaneously with these events, after the fall of the Russian Empire in 1917, numerous military formations were formed on Ukrainian lands, including detachments of the Free Cossacks, Makhno's Revolutionary Insurgent Army of Ukraine, and the Bolshevik Red Cossacks. The latter became the basis of the puppet armed forces of the UkrSSR, and after the occupation of the Ukrainian People's Republic were included in the Red Army. After the collapse of the Austro-Hungarian Empire in 1918, the Ukrainian Galician Army came to the defence of the Western Ukrainian People's Republic, based on the formation of the Ukrainian Sich Riflemen of the former Austro-Hungarian Army.

During World War II, Ukrainians tried to regain independence and organised armed units and formations, including the Ukrainian Insurgent Army, but all of them were destroyed by Soviet authorities within a few years after the war, and Ukrainians were again forced to serve in the Soviet Armed Forces.

=== Origins of the post-1992 Ukrainian Armed Forces ===
By 1992, the Ukrainian Armed Forces had been completely inherited from the Soviet Union, in which Ukraine had been a member state (a union republic). Like other Soviet republics, it did not possess its own separate military command, as all military formations were uniformly subordinated to the central command of the Soviet Armed Forces. Administratively, the Ukrainian SSR was divided into three Soviet military districts (the Carpathian Military District, Kyiv Military District, and Odesa Military District). Three Soviet air commands and most of the Black Sea Fleet naval bases were located on the coast of Ukraine. Majority of the officers were educated in Soviet educational institutions, many of them which came under the AFU, what is now the Ivan Bohun High School was actually a Soviet-established institution.

When the Soviet Union collapsed in 1991, the newly independent state of Ukraine inherited one of the most powerful force groupings in Europe. According to an associate of the Conflict Studies Research Centre, James Sherr: "This grouping, its inventory of equipment and its officer corps was designed for one purpose: to wage combined arms, coalition, offensive (and nuclear) warfare against NATO on an external front". At that time, the former Soviet armed forces in the Ukrainian SSR included the 43rd Rocket Army, the 5th, 14th 17th and 24th Air Armies of the Soviet Air Forces, an air-defence army (8th Air Defence Army), three regular armies, two tank armies, the 32nd Army Corps, and the Black Sea Fleet. Altogether the Armed Forces of Ukraine included about 780,000 personnel, 6,500 battle tanks, about 7,000 armoured vehicles, 1,500 combat aircraft, and more than 350 ships of the former Soviet Navy. Along with their equipment and personnel, Ukraine's armed forces inherited the battle honours and lineage of the Soviet military forces stationed in Ukraine, as well as Guards unit titles for many formations. However, due to the deterioration of Russian-Ukrainian relations and the continued stigma of being associated with the Soviet Union, in 2015 President Poroshenko ordered the removal of most of the citations awarded during the Soviet era to formations of the Armed Forces and other uniformed organisations.

In February 1991, a parliamentary Standing Commission for Questions of Security and Defense was established. On 24 August 1991, the Ukrainian parliament (the Verkhovna Rada), in adopting the Declaration of Independence of Ukraine, also enacted a short resolution "About military formations in Ukraine". This took jurisdiction over all formations of the armed forces of the Soviet Union stationed on Ukrainian soil and established one of the key agencies, the Ukrainian Ministry of Defence. On 3 September 1991, the Ministry of Defence commenced its duties. On 22 October 1991 units and formations of the Soviet Armed Forces on Ukrainian soil were nationalised. Subsequently, the Supreme Council of Ukraine adopted two Laws of Ukraine on 6 December 1991 regarding the creation of the Armed Forces (this is marked as Armed Forces Day), and Presidential Decree #4 "About Armed Forces of Ukraine" on 12 December 1991. The government of Ukraine surrendered any rights of succession to the Soviet Strategic Deterrence Forces (see Strategic Missile Troops) that were staged on the territory of Ukraine. Recognising the complications of a smooth transition and seeking a consensus with other former members of the Soviet Union in dividing up their Soviet military inheritance, Ukraine joined ongoing talks that started in December 1991 regarding a joint military command of the Commonwealth of Independent States.

Inherent in the process of creating a domestic military were political decisions by the Ukrainian leadership regarding the country's non-nuclear and international status. Among these were the definition, agreement, and ratification of the 1990 Treaty on Conventional Armed Forces in Europe (CFE), which not only established the maximum level of armament for each republic of the former USSR, but also a special ceiling for the so-called CFE "Flank Region" – included in this region were Ukraine's Mykolaiv, Kherson and Zaporizhzhia oblasts, and the Autonomous Republic of Crimea. Another key event in the development of the Ukrainian military was the 1992 Tashkent Treaty, which laid out aspirations for a Commonwealth of Independent States military. However, this collective military proved impossible to develop because the former republics of the USSR all wished to go their own way, ripping the intricate Soviet military machine into pieces.

Ukraine had observer status with the Non-Aligned Movement of nation-states from 1996. However, due to the 2014 Russian aggression against Ukraine, the Verkhovna Rada repealed this status in December 2014.

=== Arms control and disarmament ===
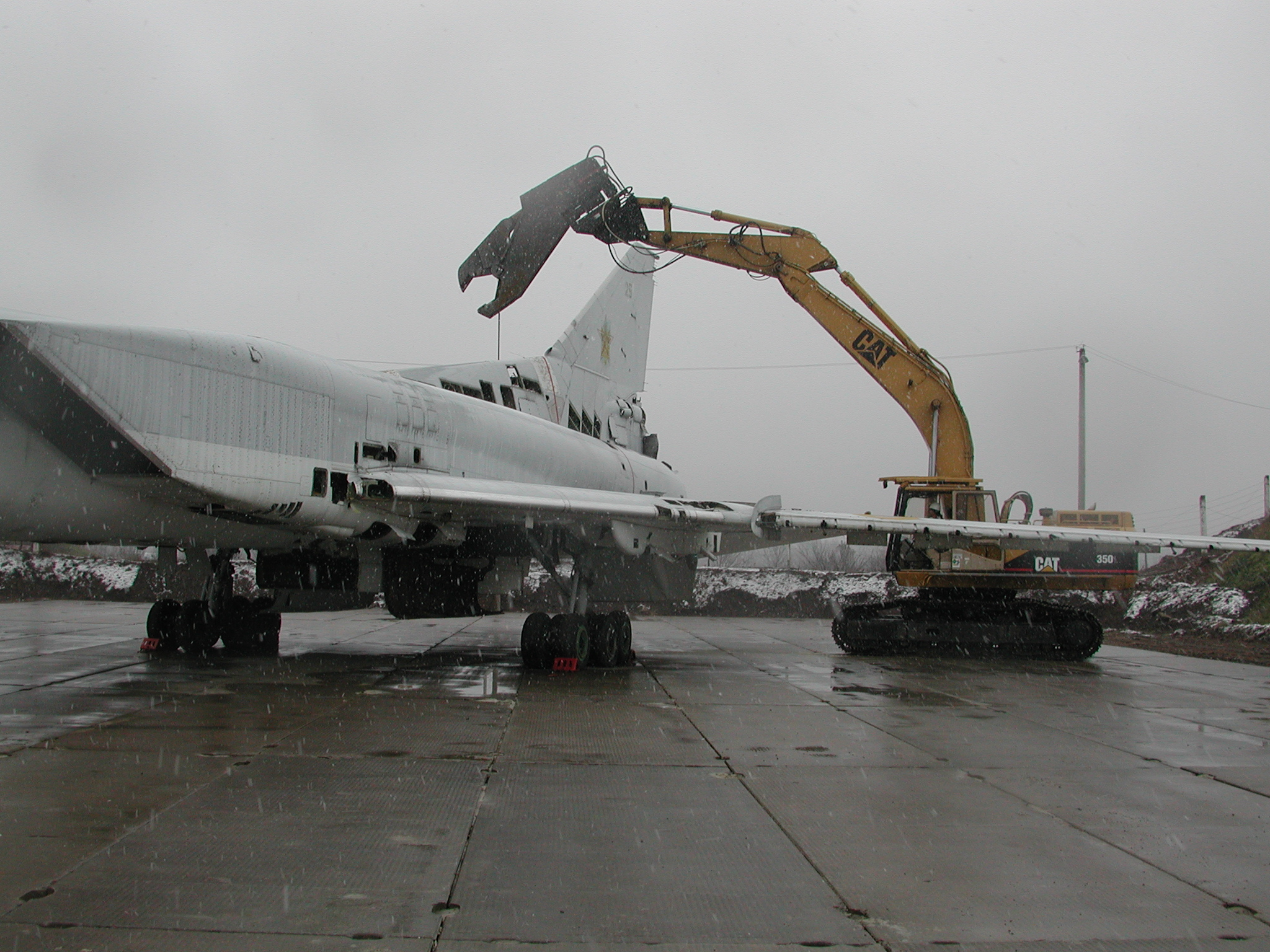
A Tu-22M being dismantled through assistance provided by the Cooperative Threat Reduction Program implemented by the DTRA, 2002

Following the break-up of the Soviet Union, Ukraine inherited two divisions of the Strategic Rocket Forces' 43rd Rocket Army (HQ Vinnytsia):

- the 19th Rocket Division (Khmelnytskyi) (90 UR-100N/SS-19/RS-18) and
- the 46th Rocket Division at Pervomaisk, Mykolaiv Oblast, equipped with 40 SS-19 and 46 silo-mounted RT-23 Molodets/SS-24s.

While Ukraine had physical control of these systems, it did not have operational control. The use of the weapons depended on Russian-controlled electronic Permissive Action Links and the Russian command and control system.

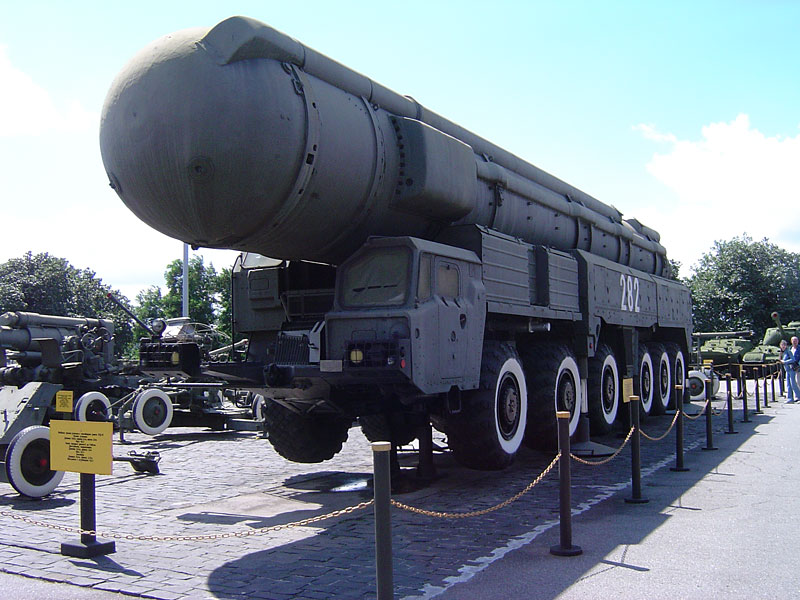
An SS-20 on display at the World War II Museum in Kyiv

Ukraine voluntarily gave up these and all other nuclear weapons during the early 1990s. This was the first time in history that a country voluntarily gave up the use of strategic nuclear weapons, although South Africa was dismantling its small tactical nuclear weapons programme at about the same time.

Ukraine had plentiful amounts of highly enriched uranium, which the United States wanted to buy from the Kharkiv Institute of Physics and Technology. Ukraine also had two uranium mining and processing factories, a heavy water plant and technology for determining the isotopic composition of fissionable materials. Ukraine possessed deposits of uranium that were among the world's richest. In May 1992, Ukraine signed the Strategic Arms Reduction Treaty (START I), in which the country agreed to give up all nuclear weapons and to join the Nuclear Non-Proliferation Treaty as a non-nuclear weapon state. Ukraine ratified the treaty in 1994, and as of 1 January 1996, no military nuclear equipment or materials remained on Ukrainian territory nor even were operated by the AFU.

On 13 May 1994, the United States and Ukraine signed a Memorandum of Understanding on the Transfer of Missile Equipment and Technology. This agreement committed Ukraine to the Missile Technology Control Regime (MTCR) by controlling exports of missile-related equipment and technology according to the MTCR Guidelines.

Ukraine and NATO estimate that 2.5 million tons of conventional ammunition were left in Ukraine as the Soviet military withdrew, as well as more than 7 million rifles, pistols, mortars, and machine guns. The surplus weapons and ammunition were stored in over 180 military bases, including in bunkers, salt mines and in the open. As of 2014, much of this surplus had not been scrapped.

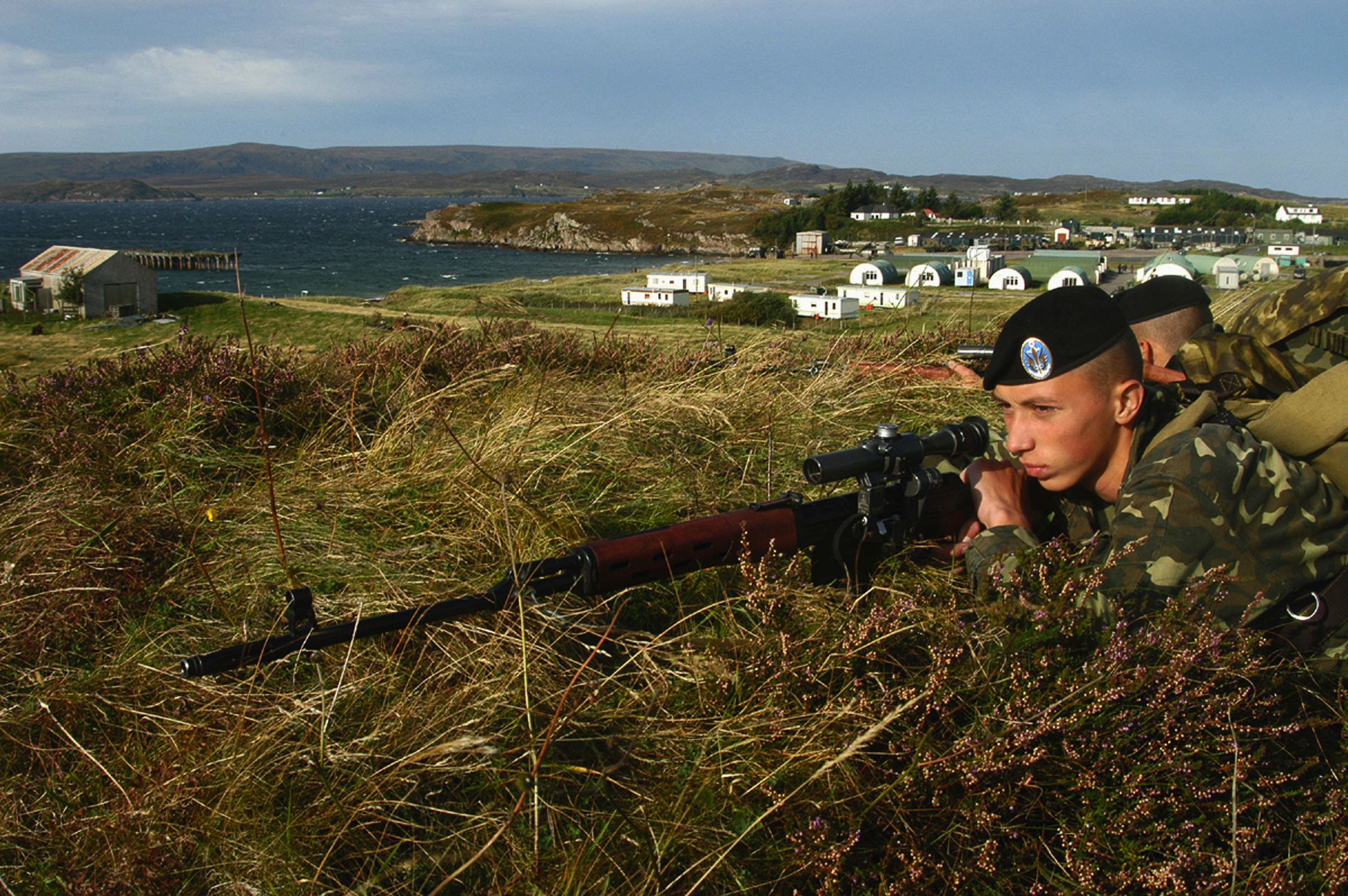
Marine of the Ukrainian Marine Corps in a military exercise in Scotland, 2003

=== Attempt at reforms and constant fund shortages ===
Ukraine's first military reforms began in December 1996, with the adoption of a new "State Program for the Building and Development of the Armed Forces of Ukraine". One aspect of it was to shrink the standard combat unit from division size to brigade size, which would then fall under the command of one of the three newly created military districts:

- the Western Operational Command,
- the Southern Operational Command, and the largest
- the Northern Operational/Territorial Command. Only Ukraine's 1st Airmobile Division was not downsized. This downsizing occurred purely for financial reasons, with the Ukrainian economy in recession this was a way to shrink the government (defence) expenditure and at the same time to release hundreds of thousands of young people into the private sector to stimulate growth. During this time Ukraine's military-industrial complex also began to develop new indigenous weapons for the armed forces like the T-84 tank, the BMP-1U, the BTR-3, KrAZ-6322, and the Antonov An-70. All these reforms were championed by Leonid Kuchma, the second President of Ukraine, who wanted to retain a capable military and a functioning military-industrial complex on the basis of a mistrust for Russia, stating once "The threat of Russification is a real concern for us".

The cancellation of the modernisation programme left a question of how to provide jobs in the military industrial complex which then comprised a double-digit percentage of the GDP. Export of new and modernised weapons on the world's arms markets was settled on as the best option, where Ukraine both tried to undercut the contracts of the Russian arms industry – offering the same service for a cheaper price, and was willing to sell equipment to whoever was willing to pay (more than once to politically unstable or even aggressive regimes), causing negative reactions from both Western Europe and the United States federal government. During this time 320 T-80 tanks were sold to Pakistan and an unfinished Soviet aircraft carrier the Varyag, today known as the Chinese aircraft carrier Liaoning.

Though the military was well-equipped, it still experienced lack of funds particularly for training and exercises, which led to a number of incidents. In one. the Siberia Airlines Flight 1812 of 2001 and the Sknyliv airshow disaster of 2002, but the military's effectiveness was demonstrated in the Tuzla Island Conflict.

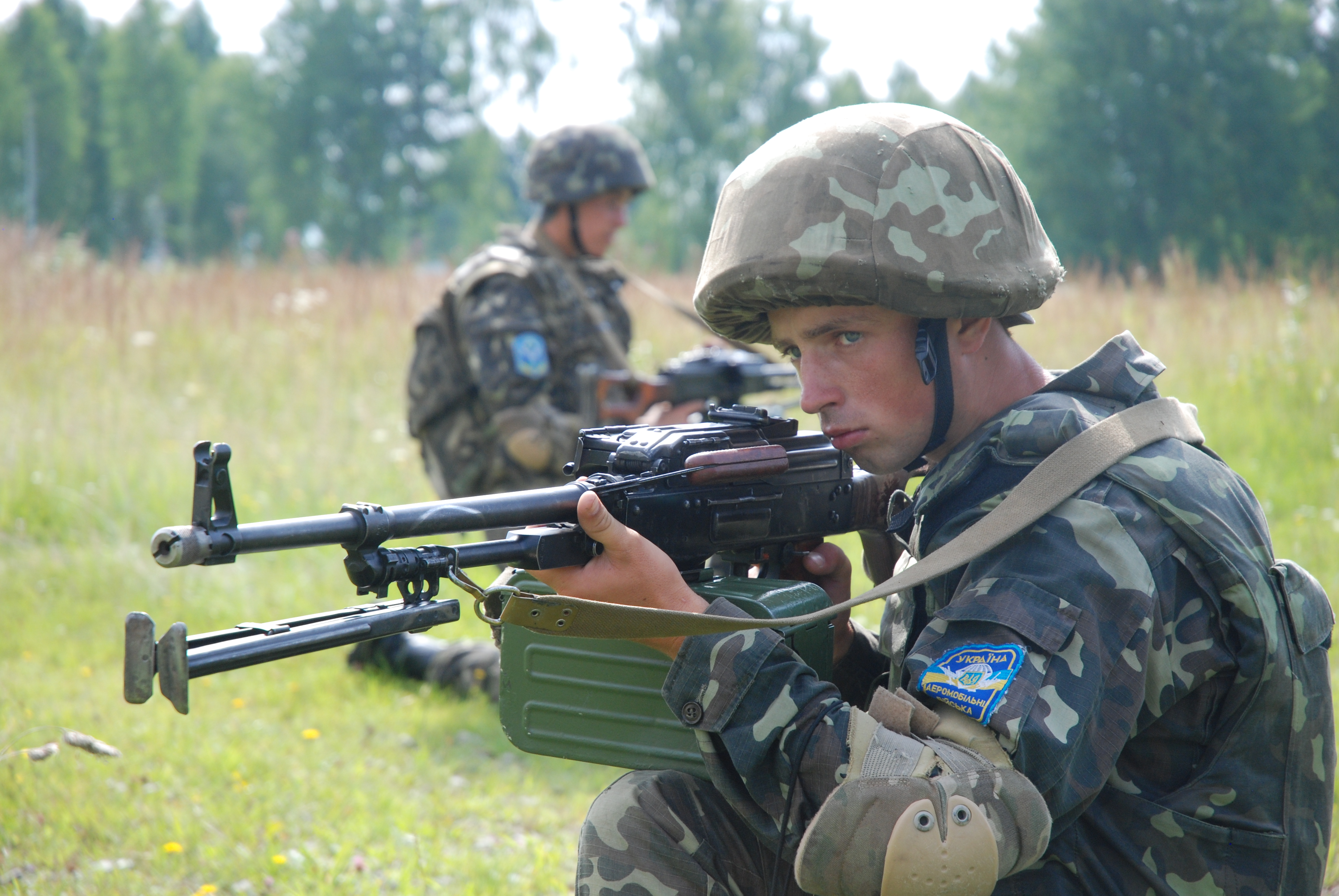
Ukrainian Airmobile Forces in 2011

Ukrainian military tactics and organisation heavily depended on Cold War tactics and former Soviet Armed Forces organisation. Under former President Yushchenko, Ukraine pursued a policy of independence from Russian dominance, and thus tried to fully integrate with the West, specifically NATO.

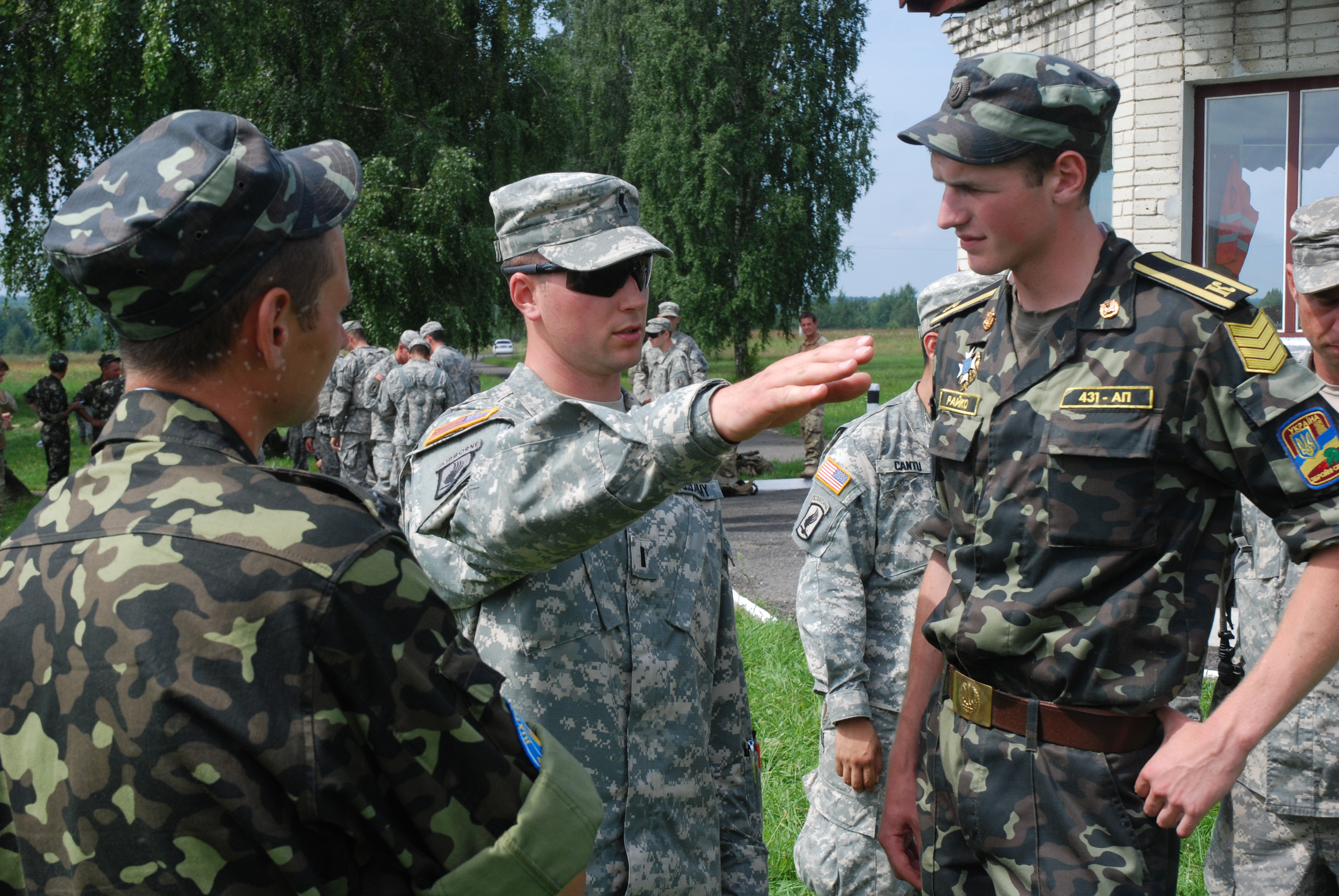
Ukrainian soldiers talking with a US Army soldier during the Rapid Trident 2011 military exercise

Until the Euromaidan crisis of 2014, Ukraine retained tight military relations with Russia, inherited from their common Soviet history. Common uses for naval bases in Crimea and joint air defence efforts were the most intense cooperative efforts. This cooperation was a permanent irritant in bilateral relations, but Ukraine appeared economically dependent on Moscow, and thus unable to break such ties quickly. After the election of President Viktor Yanukovych, ties between Moscow and Kyiv warmed, and those between Kyiv and NATO cooled, relative to the Yushchenko years.

=== Russo-Ukrainian war (2014–present) ===
In March 2014, following the Revolution of Dignity and the annexation of Crimea by the Russian Federation, the government of Ukraine announced a new military service, the National Guard of Ukraine. Previously, a National Guard had existed up to 2000, so the 2014 NG was a reformation of the one raised in 1991, but this time formed part of the Internal Troops of Ukraine.

In May 2014, when Russian aggression started in the eastern regions, a helicopter with 14 soldiers on board, including General Serhiy Kulchytskiy, who headed combat and special training for the country's National Guard, was brought down by militants near Sloviansk in East Ukraine. Outgoing president Oleksandr Turchynov described the downing as a "terrorist attack," and blamed pro-Russian militants.

In the early months of the Russo–Ukrainian War, the Armed Forces were widely criticised for their poor equipment and inept leadership, forcing Internal Affairs Ministry forces like the National Guard and the territorial defence battalions to take on the brunt of the fighting in the first months of the war.

In late July 2015, the Ukrainian Defence Ministry revealed the new Ukrainian Armed Forces uniform designs, and later a revised rank insignia system was created. These made their national debut on 24 August 2016, at the National Independence Day Silver Jubilee parade in Independence Square, Kyiv.

From the early 1990s, the Armed Forces had numerous units and formations with Soviet Armed Forces decorations dating back to the Second World War or earlier. Due to the decommunisation process in Ukraine, all these decorations were removed from unit titles and regimental colours by 15 November 2015 to cease promotion and glorification of the Soviet symbols. Ukraine had retained a number of Guards units, also following a Soviet tradition. A list can be seen at List of guards units of Ukraine. On 22 August 2016, the "Guards" titles were removed from all unit and formation names. Only one brigade, the 51st, a former Guards unit, had been dissolved the year before.

By February 2018, the Ukrainian armed forces were larger and better equipped than ever before, numbering 200,000 active-service military personnel and most of the volunteer soldiers of the territorial defence battalions had been integrated into the official Ukrainian army.

In late 2017-early 2018 the United Nations Human Rights Monitoring Mission in Ukraine reported that human rights abuses allegedly committed by Ukrainian security forces and armed groups remained an ongoing issue of the war in Donbas that erupted in 2014. The nature of the alleged crimes ranged from unlawful or arbitrary detention to torture, ill-treatment, and sexual violence. Within the reporting period of 16 November 2017 to 15 February 2018 the Office of the United Nations High Commissioner for Human Rights (OHCHR) monitoring mission documented 115 cases of credible allegations of human rights violations committed by both sides of the conflict since 2014.

On 1 February 2022, the Territorial Defence Forces (TDF) were formed as the new branch of the Armed Forces. The TDF serves as a military reserve force which is formed by volunteers who are mobilised for local defence. The branch is an expansion of the old territorial defence battalions system established in 2014.

=== Ukraine and NATO membership ===
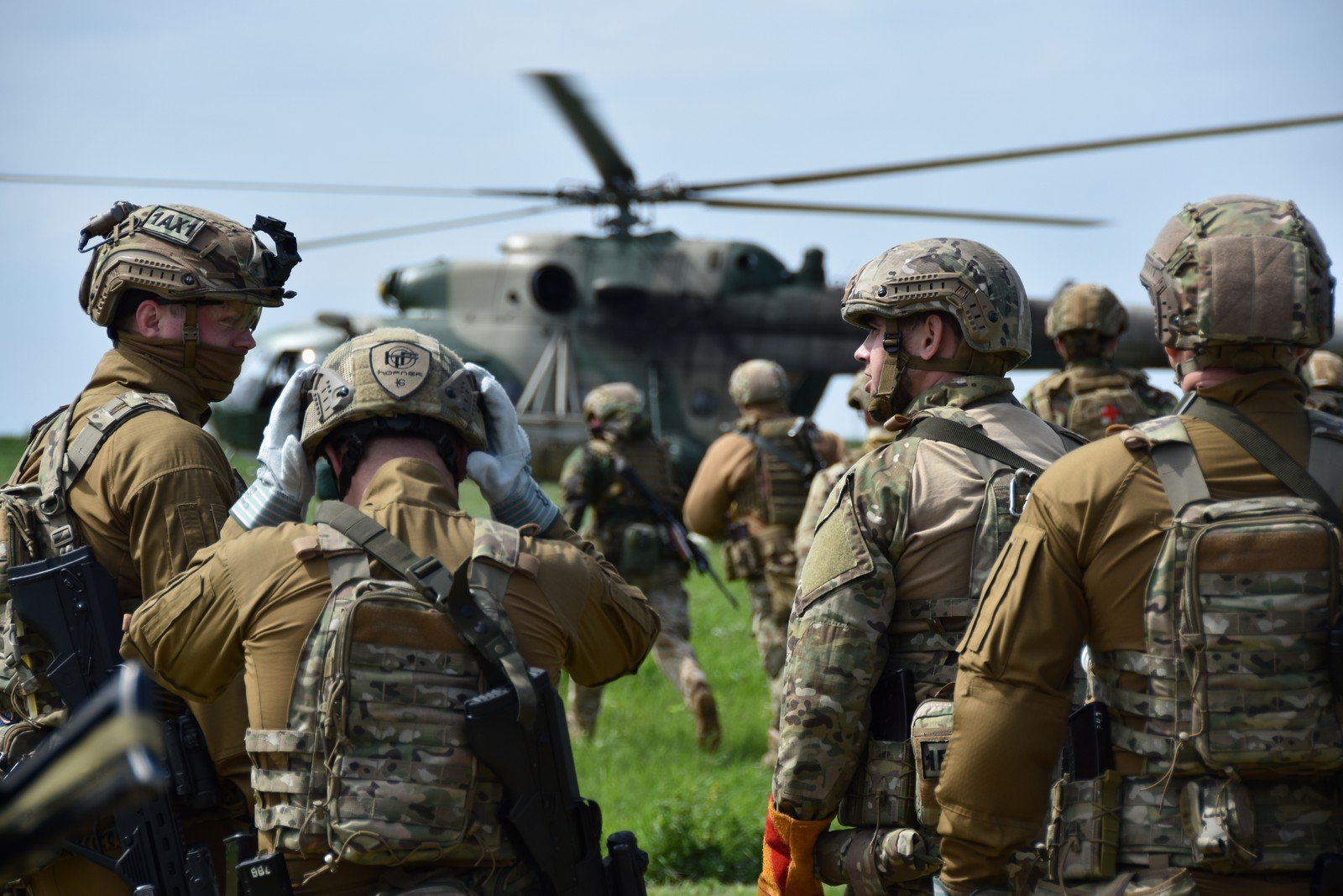
Operators of the Special Operations Forces, an independent branch of the armed forces founded in 2016

==== Relations prior to the Russian invasion ====
Former president of Ukraine Viktor Yushchenko had asked for Ukrainian membership by early 2008. During the 2008 Bucharest summit, NATO declared that Ukraine could become a member of NATO at Ukraine's discretion and when it met the criteria for accession. His successor, Viktor Yanukovych, considered the level of co-operation between Ukraine and NATO sufficient. Yanukovych, however, opted to keep Ukraine a non-aligned state. This was formalised on 3 June 2010, when the Verkhovna Rada excluded, with 226 votes, the goal of "integration into Euro-Atlantic security and NATO membership" from the country's national security strategy. Amid the Euromaidan unrest, Yanukovych fled Ukraine in February 2014. The interim Yatsenyuk Government which came to power in 2014, initially said, with reference to the country's non-aligned status, that it had no plans to join NATO.

Ukraine's stated national policy is Euro-Atlantic integration, with the European Union. Ukraine has a "Distinctive Partnership" with NATO (see Enlargement of NATO) and has been an active participant in Partnership for Peace exercises and in peacekeeping in the Balkans. This close relationship with NATO has been most apparent in Ukrainian cooperation and combined peacekeeping operations with its neighbour Poland in Kosovo. Ukrainian servicemen also served under NATO command in Iraq, Afghanistan and in Operation Active Endeavour.

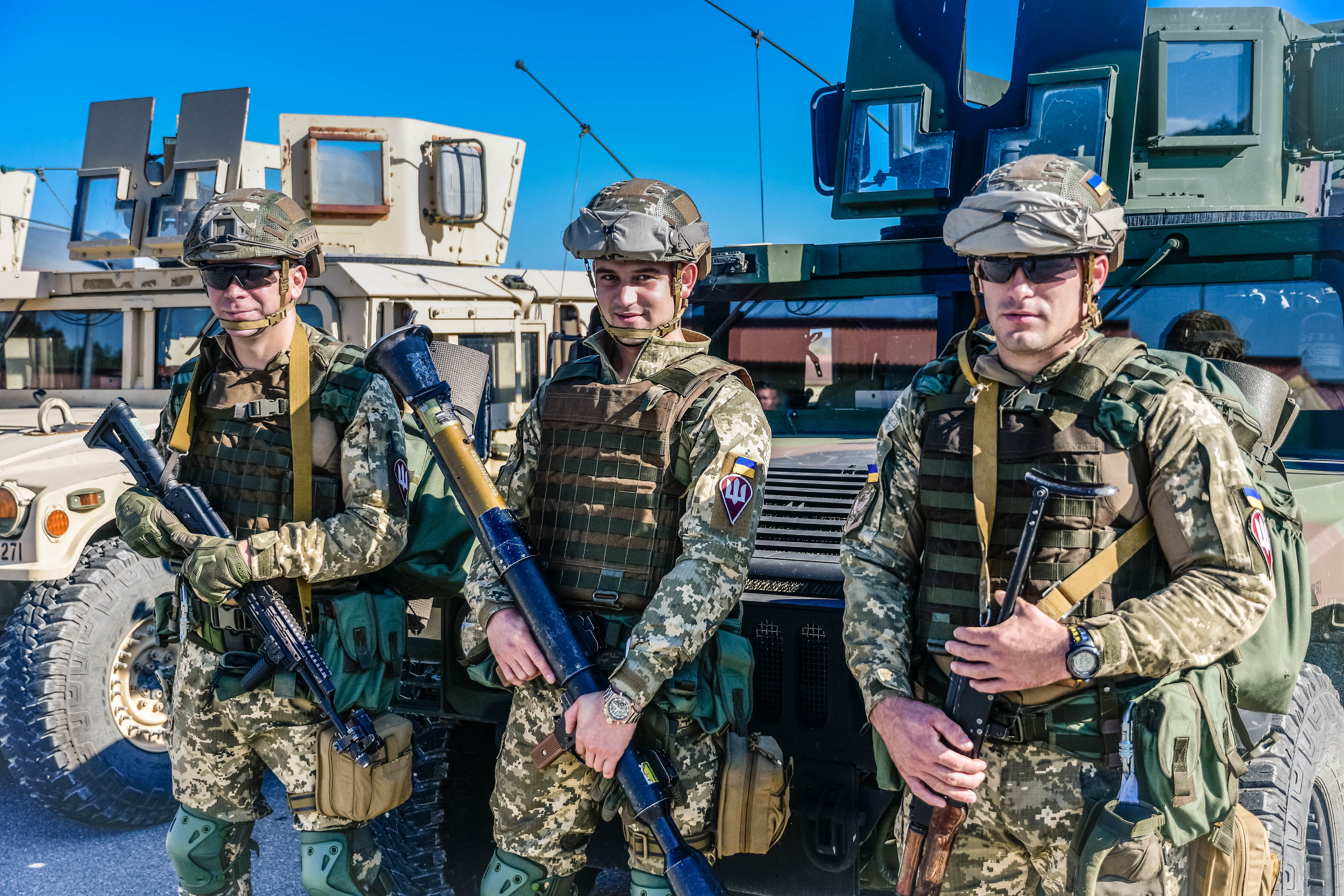
Ukrainian Air Assault Forces paratroopers with new modernised equipment

==== Post-2014 relations ====
However, following the Russo–Ukrainian war and parliamentary elections in October 2014, the new government made joining NATO a priority. On 23 December 2014, the Verkhovna Rada renounced Ukraine's non-aligned status that "proved to be ineffective in guaranteeing Ukraine's security and protecting the country from external aggression and pressure".

The Ukrainian military is since transforming to NATO standards. Prime Minister of Ukraine Arseniy Yatsenyuk stated early February 2016 that de facto the Armed Forces must, soon as possible, begin its transition for Ukrainian entry into NATO and towards NATO-capable armed forces.

During the Russian buildup on the border in 2021, President Volodymyr Zelenskyy made a renewed call to Western powers for NATO membership, but was ultimately unsuccessful.

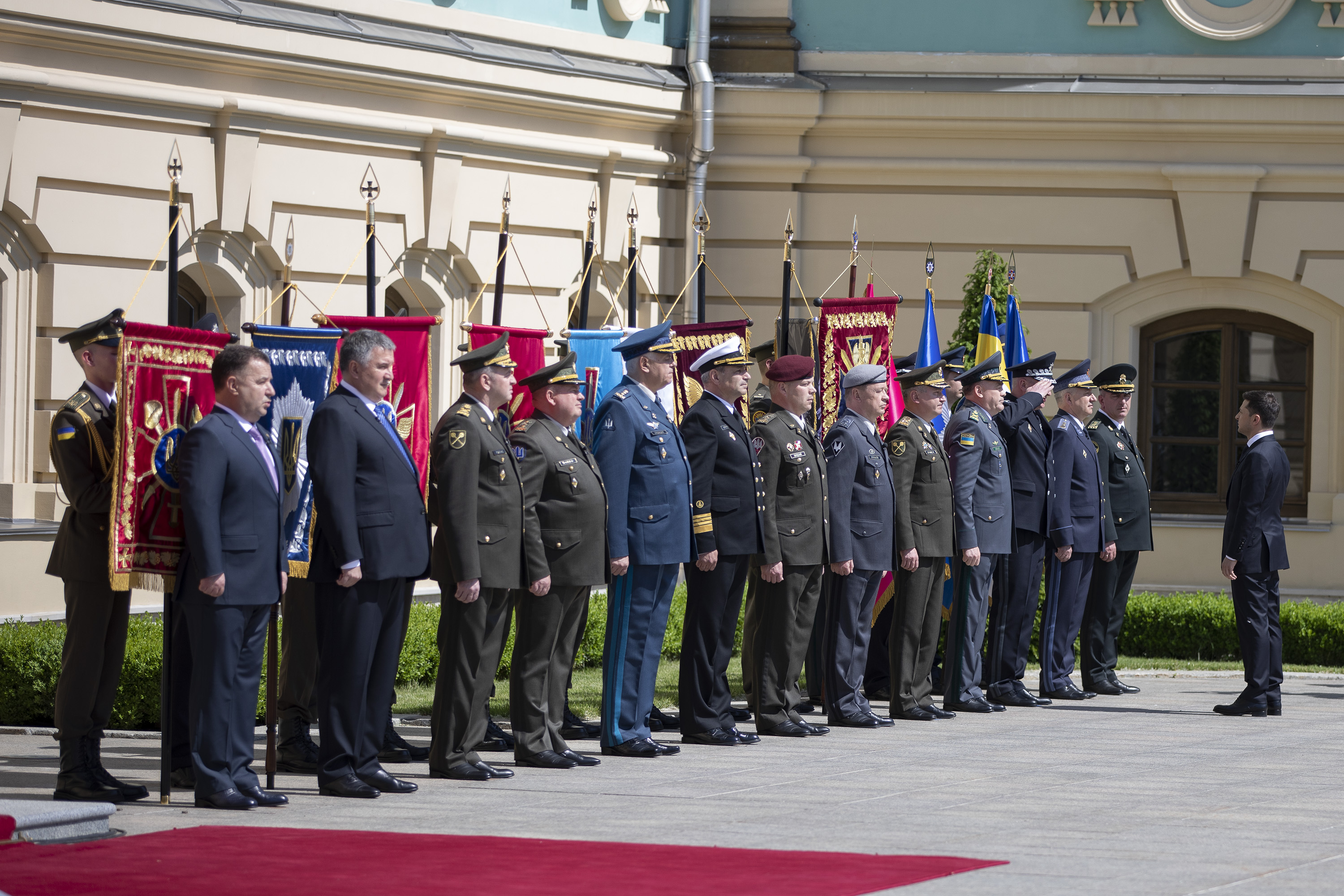
President Volodymyr Zelenskyy with the senior leadership of the Ukrainian military in May 2019

However, following the 2022 Russian invasion of Ukraine, NATO military logistical support, including a wide array of arms and ammunition, was rapidly provided by NATO countries, and continued to the present (mid-2024) – with commitments for its indefinite continuance—and NATO officials and member states' leaders began to declare that Ukraine's eventual membership in NATO was expected following conclusion of the war.

In 2023, Ukraine's defence minister, Oleksii Reznikov, described Ukraine as, essentially, a "de facto" member of NATO, with the expectation that "in the near future" Ukraine would become an actual "de jure" member of NATO.

=== Russian invasion of Ukraine ===
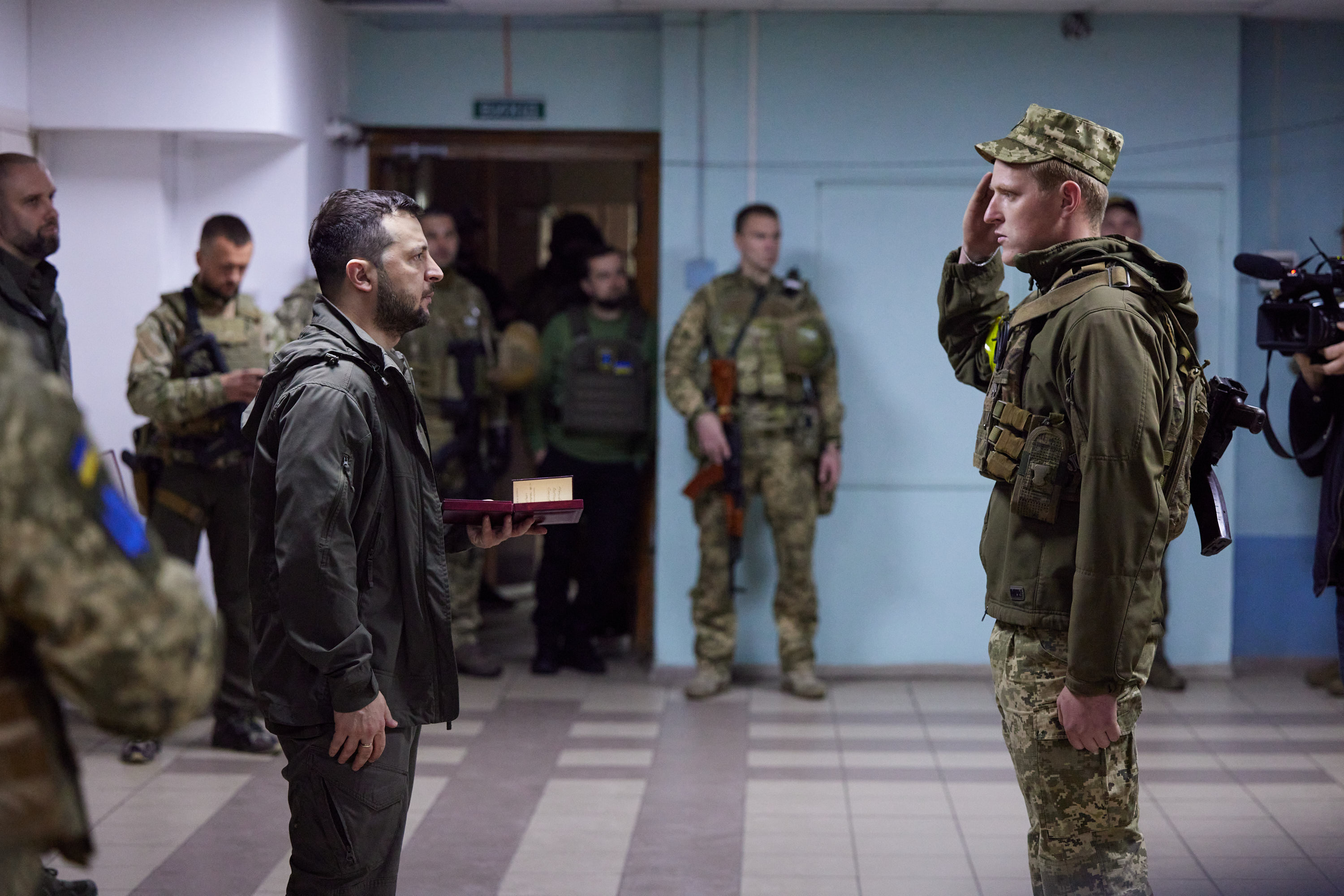
President Zelenskyy awarding a soldier near the front line in the Kharkiv Oblast, 29 May 2022

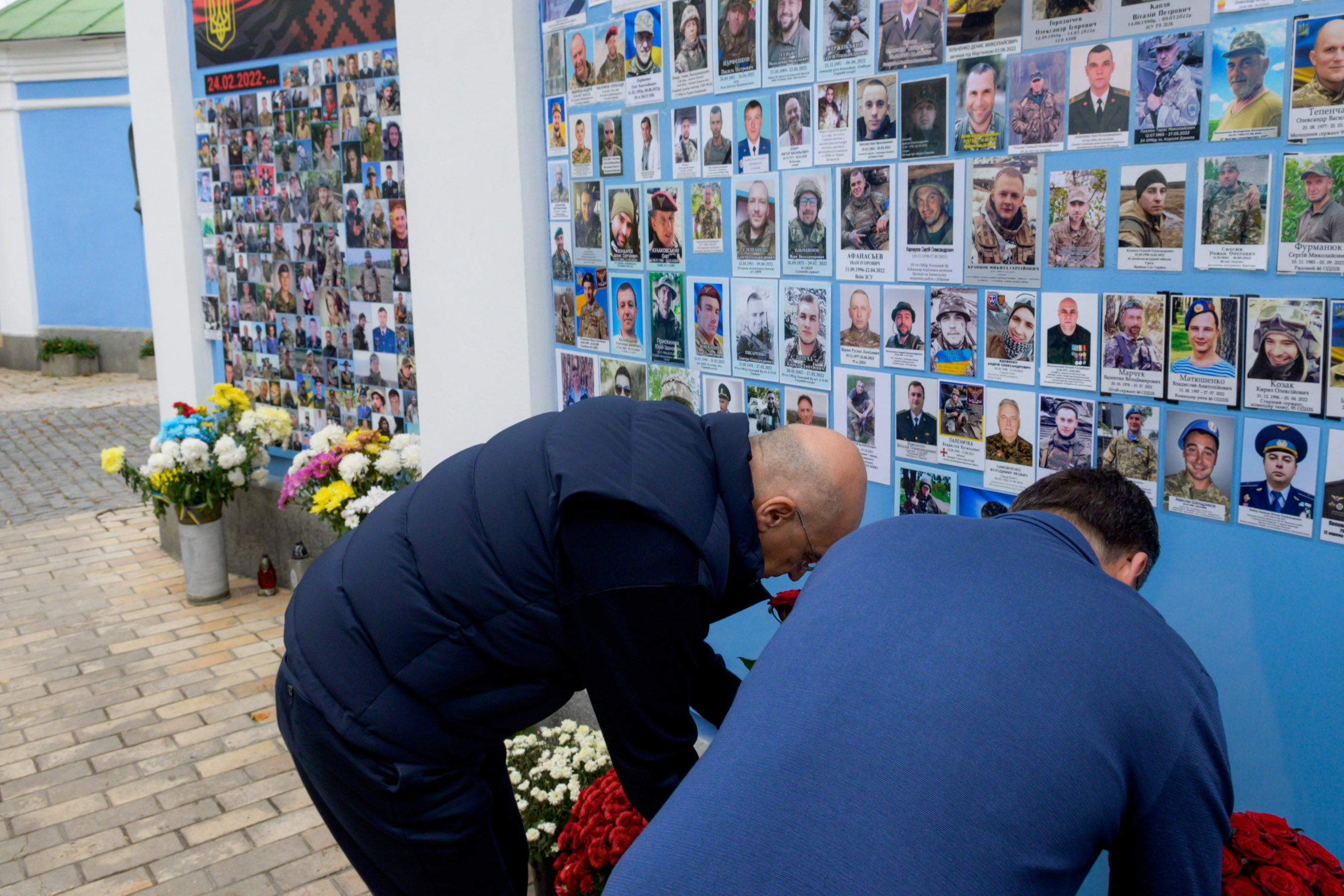
Monument to Ukrainian soldiers killed during the Russian invasion of Ukraine in 2022

On Thursday, 24 February 2022, the Russian Armed Forces invaded Ukraine. The Ukrainian Armed Forces and its auxiliary and wartime-affiliated organisations, have participated in many of the combat actions of the current conflict. Alongside the combat actions, the influx of Western weapons and materiel to the Armed Forces from NATO member armed forces, ex-Soviet stock from many Eastern European nations as well as captured Russian tanks, armed vehicles and other weapons have also resulted in an ongoing modernisation and expansion of the forces at large.

As of 2010 the total personnel was 200,000 (including 41,000 civilian workers). Conscription was stopped in October 2013; at that time the Ukrainian armed forces were made up of 40% conscripts and 60% contract soldiers. Acting president Oleksandr Turchynov reinstated conscription in May 2014.

In early 2014, Ukraine had 130,000 personnel in its armed forces, which could be boosted to about one million with reservists.

There were a reported total of 250,800 personnel in the Armed Forces in 2015. In July 2022, Defence Minister Oleksii Reznikov stated that the Armed Forces had an active strength of 700,000; Reznikov also mentioned that with the Border Guard, National Guard, and police added, the total comes to around one million.

Following the Revolution of Dignity, Ukraine adopted a military doctrine focusing on defence against Russia and announced Ukraine's intentions for closer relations with NATO armed services, most especially if it joins the organisation in the future.

In June 2022, Davyd Arakhamia, Ukraine's chief negotiator with Russia, told Axios that between 200 and 500 Ukrainian soldiers were killed every day during the Russian invasion of Ukraine. In August 2023, The New York Times quoted unnamed US officials as saying that up to 70,000 Ukrainian troops had been killed and 100,000 to 120,000 wounded. In April 2024, President Zelenskyy signed a new mobilisation law to increase the number of troops. From 2023, desertion is punishable by up to 12 years in prison. According to the Prosecutor General's Office, more than 100,000 criminal cases for desertion were initiated by the end of November 2024.

In August 2022, Amnesty International noted "a pattern of Ukrainian forces putting civilians at risk and violating the laws of war when they operate in populated areas," citing numerous instances of the Ukrainian military placing equipment nearby or inside buildings occupied by civilians, and then firing at Russian forces. Amnesty also noted the use of hospitals and schools near populated residential neighbourhoods as Ukrainian military facilities.

Since the beginning of the invasion, several new branches to the Armed Forces have been established or proposed to match or outmatch the capabilities of the Russian Armed Forces, including Unmanned Systems Forces (the first-ever drone branch of any military), Assault Forces, Space Forces, and Cyber Forces.

During July 2026 defence minister Mykhailo Fedorov was dismissed from his position by president Zelenskyy in a controversial move. In his place stepped Yevhen Khmara as acting defence minister. Just a few days later Commander-in-Chief Oleksandr Syrskyi was replaced as well and followed by Mykhailo Drapatyi.

== Structure ==
The law 'On the Foundations of National Resistance' establishes the following structure of the Ukrainian Armed Forces:

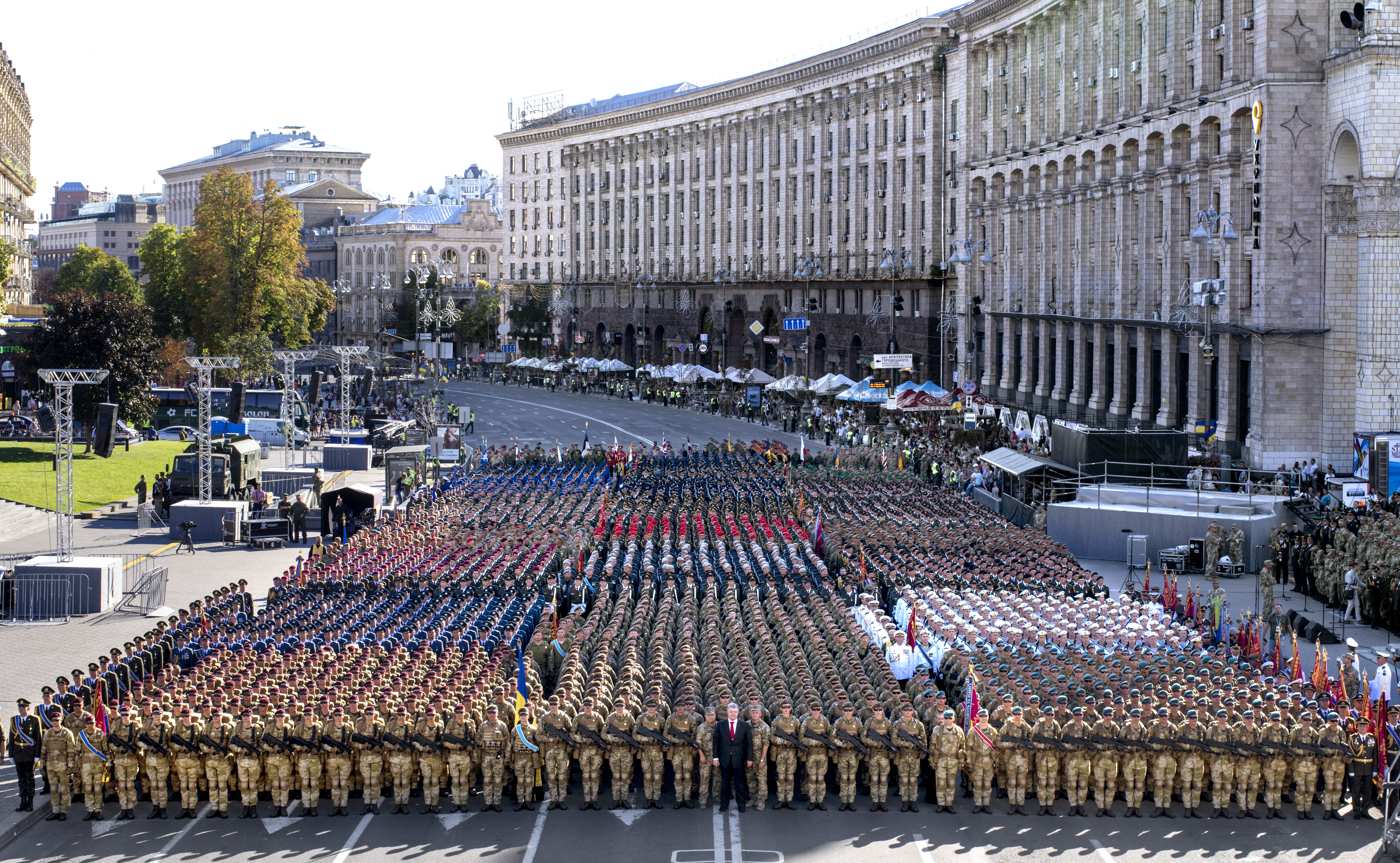
Army Parade on the occasion of the Independence Day of Ukraine (2018)

- General Staff of the Armed Forces of Ukraine
- Joint Forces Command of the Armed Forces of Ukraine
- services of the UAF
  - Ground Forces
  - Air Force
  - Navy
- separate branches of the UAF
  - Special Operations Forces
  - Territorial Defence Forces
  - Logistics Forces
  - Support Forces
  - Medical Forces
- separate troop arms of the UAF
  - Ukrainian Air Assault Forces
  - Communications and Cybersecurity Troops
- organs of military command and control, formations and units, which are separate from the services, branches and arms

=== Chief of the General Staff ===
The Chief of the General Staff oversees the Armed Forces of Ukraine. The following units fall under the direct supervision of the General Staff:

Apparatus [Office] of the Commander of the Armed Forces of Ukraine, Kyiv

Office of the General Staff of the Armed Forces of Ukraine, Kyiv

Units directly subordinated to the General Staff of the AFU:

- Joint Forces Command (MU А0135), Kyiv
- Main Command Center of the AFU (MU А0911), Kyiv
- Back-up Command Center of the AFU (MU А3258), Radomyshl, Zhytomyr Oblast
- 15th Airborne Command and Control Center of the General Staff of the AFU (MU А0905), Vinnytsia, Vinnytsia Oblast
- Main Directorate for Moral and Psychological Support of the AFU, Kyiv
- Main Directorate for Military Cooperation and Verification of the AFU, Kyiv
- Central Military Security Directorate, Kyiv
- Directorate for Career Development of NCO Personnel, Kyiv
- 101st Separate Security Brigade of the General Staff 'Colonel-General Henadii Vorobiov' (МУ А0139), Kyiv
- other units and establishments directly under the General Staff of the AFU

Military Educational Establishments and Units (directly under the MoD)

- National Defence University of Ukraine, Kyiv
- Military Institute of the Taras Shevchenko National University of Kyiv, Kyiv
- Zhytomyr Military Institute 'Sergei Korolev', Zhytomyr, Zhytomyr Oblast
  - 190th Training Center, Huyva, Zhytomyr Oblast
- Military Judicial Institute of the Yaroslav Mudryi National Law University, Kharkiv, Kharkiv Oblast
- Kyiv Military High School 'Ivan Bohun', Kyiv

=== Ukrainian Ground Forces ===
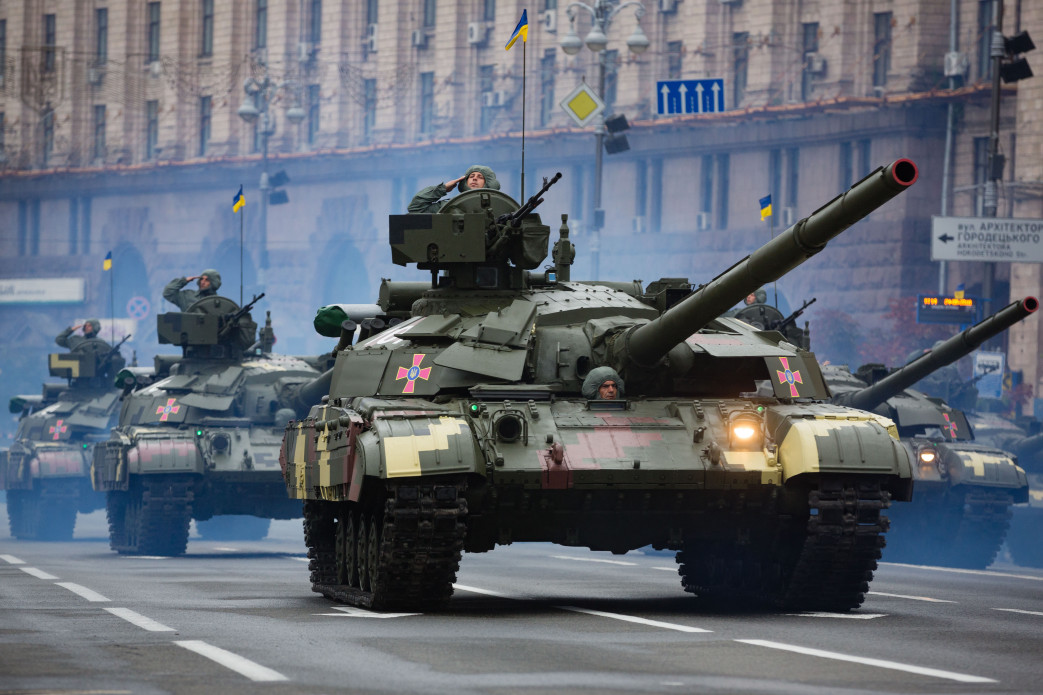
Ukrainian T-64BM Bulat

As of 2016, there were a reported 169,000 personnel in the Ukrainian Ground Forces. The 2022 Russian invasion of Ukraine resulted in massive increases in personnel numbers; Defence Minister Reznikov stated the armed forces had a strength of 700,000 in July 2022, not counting the border guard, national guard, or police. The Ukrainian Ground Forces are divided into Armoured Forces and Mechanised Forces, Army Aviation, Army Air Defence and Rocket and Artillery Troops. There are 13 mechanised brigades and two mountain warfare brigades in the Mechanised Forces. Ukraine also has two armoured brigades. There are also seven rocket and artillery brigades. Until 2013, the Ground Forces were divided into three army corps. These were disbanded in 2013 and reorganised as Operation Command West, Operation Command North and Operation Command South. Operation Command East was formed in 2015 to coordinate forces in the war in Donbas.

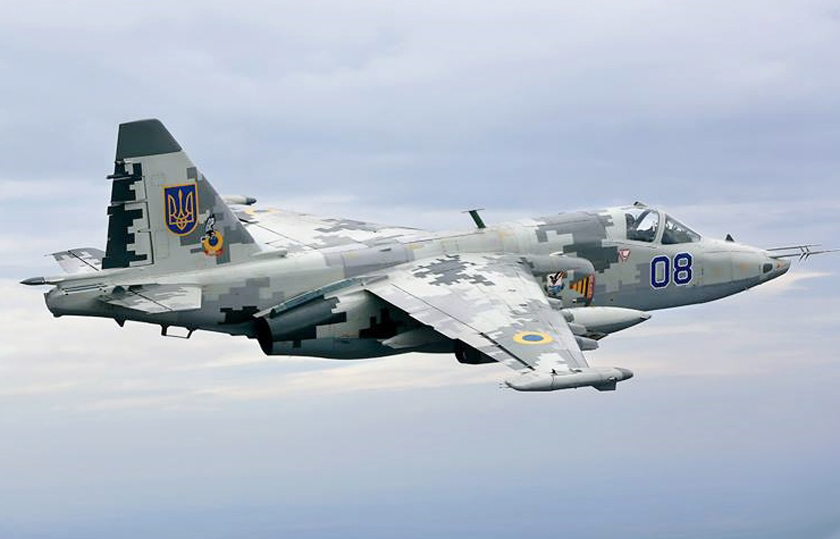
Ukrainian Su-25

Operational commands mainly have an administrative role, and do not have a corps-level battle staff. Brigades are the main unit and the backbone of the Ground Forces, with organic combat, combat support, and combat service support units. Command and control above the level of brigades is provided by ad hoc operational groups. Since 2022 Ukraine has been transitioning to a corps-based system. Several corps have been established since 2023, which in the Ground Forces include the 3rd, 11th, 12th, 14th, 15th, 16th, 17th, 18th, 19th, 20th, and 21st Army Corps as of mid-2025. This organisational pattern follows a Russian structure, in which a corps has control over brigades (instead of divisions) and brigades are fully mobile and have more artillery than their NATO counterparts. The corps are built up around capable brigades.

=== Air Force ===
The Ukrainian Air Force (Ukrainian: Повітряні сили Збройних сил України, romanized: Povitryani syly Zbroynykh syl Ukrayiny, lit. 'Air Forces of the Armed Forces [of] Ukraine', PS ZSU) is the air force of Ukraine and one of the eight branches of the Armed Forces of Ukraine (ZSU). Its current form was created in 2004 by merging the Ukrainian Air Defence Forces into the Air Force.

When the Soviet Union dissolved in 1991, many aircraft were left in Ukrainian territory as the Soviet Air Force disbanded. After Ukrainian independence in 1991, the air force suffered from chronic under-investment, leading to the bulk of its inventory becoming mothballed or otherwise inoperable. However its domestic defense industry Ukroboronprom and its Antonov subsidiary are able to maintain its older aircraft.

The Ukrainian Air Force participated in the war in Donbas. Following the 2014 ceasefire, the air force was suspended from carrying out missions in the areas of Donbas. Since February 2022, the Air Force has been engaged in constant combat operations in the face of the Russian invasion of Ukraine. The Air Force primarily flies Soviet-made aircraft, with an estimated 45 Mikoyan MiG-29 and 23 Sukhoi Su-27 multirole combat aircraft. Since the invasion, Ukraine now operates 39 General Dynamics F-16s, and 6 Mirage 2000s, with the former supported by the F-16 training coalition. In the long term, Ukraine aims to procure Gripen and Rafale combat aircraft, supported by Saab 340 AEW&C. In air defense, the Air Force operates approximately 178 S-300 missile system units, and eight MIM-104 Patriot units.

=== Naval Service ===
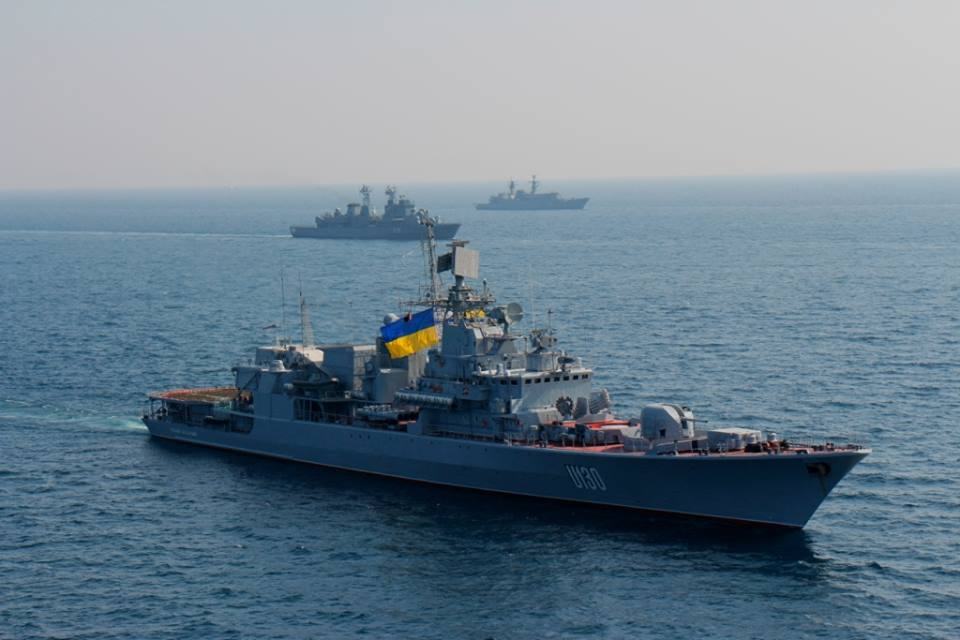
The Krivak III-class frigate Hetman Sahaydachniy; the previous flagship of the Ukrainian Navy before being scuttled in 2022.

According to a 2015 Kyiv Post report, the Ukrainian Navy consisted of 6,500 servicemen, Marine Corps included at that time.

In 2023, the president of Ukraine, Volodymyr Zelenskyy, officially announced the separation of the Ukrainian Marine Corps from the Navy and thus declared its independence as a service branch of the Armed Forces of Ukraine.

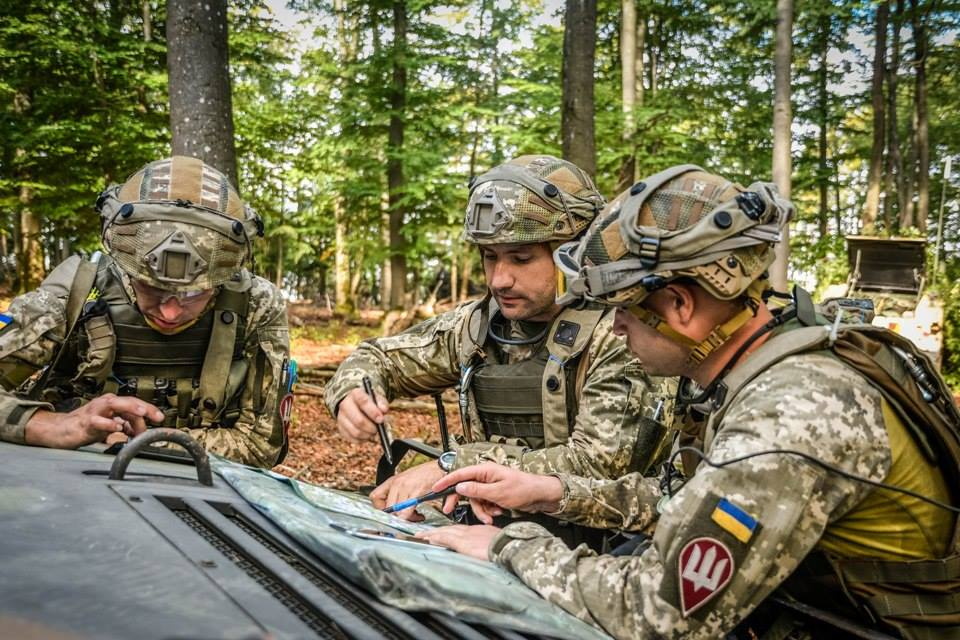
Air Assault Forces paratroopers

=== Air Assault Forces ===
The Air Assault Forces of Ukraine (abbr. AAFU; Ukrainian: Десантно-штурмові війська України, romanized: Desantno-shturmovi viiska Ukrainy, pronounced [deˌsɑntnoʃtʊrmoˈwi wijˈsʲkɑ ʊkrɐˈjinɪ], abbr. ДШВ, DShV), known until 2017 as the Ukrainian Airmobile Forces, (Note: Ukrainian: Високомобільні десантні війська України, romanized: Vysokomobilni desantni viiska Ukrainy, lit. 'High-mobility airborne forces of Ukraine'; abbreviated as VDV (ВДВ).) are the air assault infantry and airborne forces with armoured cavalry capabilities of Armed Forces of Ukraine.

After the Dissolution of the Soviet Union in 1991, several Ukraine-based units from the Soviet Airborne Forces (VDV) were absorbed into the newly created Ukrainian Ground Forces (SVZSU), where they remained until 2016, when they separated to become one of five military branches of the Armed Forces of Ukraine.

The Air Assault Forces are in constant combat readiness. They are the high-mobility branch of the military, responsible for air assault and airborne operations, combined arms, counterinsurgency in the terrains they are trained on, drone warfare, maneuver warfare, military education and training related to air assault and airborne warfare, and peacekeeping. Before the Russo-Ukrainian War they were also the main forces sent by Ukraine to peacekeeping missions around the world. They are considered the elite of Ukraine's armed forces.

=== Special Forces ===
The Special Operations Forces of the Armed Forces of Ukraine (Ukrainian: Сили спеціальних операцій Збройних сил України,, romanized: Syly spetsialnykh operatsii Zbroinykh syl Ukrainy, abbreviated ССО, SSO) are the special forces of Ukraine and one of the eight branches of the Armed Forces of Ukraine, with headquarters in Kyiv.

The SSO has the roles including various special forces-related duties such as direct action, special reconnaissance, intelligence gathering, sabotage and psychological warfare. They are not the only special forces units in Ukraine. The SSO was created in 2016, after various reforms of the Ukrainian Armed Forces due to failures in the war in Donbas. The Ukrainian special forces groups were trained on the model of NATO reaction forces. Reorganizing by concentrating the special forces command into a single unified branch. Previously, military Spetsnaz were under the command of the Chief Directorate of Intelligence (HUR), Ukraine's military intelligence service.

=== Communications and Cybernetic Security Forces ===
The Communications and Cybernetic Security Troops of the Ukrainian Armed Forces is the Signals intelligence branch, acquiring its status as a separate joint branch of the Armed Forces since 1 January 2022. The Communications and Cybernetic Security Troops Command (Командування Військ зв'язку та кібернетичної безпеки Збройних Сил України) was established as a separate joint forces command under the General Staff since 5 February 2020.

Signals and Cybernetic Security Troops Command (MU А0106), Kyiv

- Main Command Post of the Signals and Information Systems (MU А2666), Kyiv
- Main Center for Information and Telecommunications Systems Security Control (MU А0334), Kyiv
- Main Information and Telecommunications Nod (MU А0351), Kyiv
- 1st Separate Field 'Proskurov' Signals Nod (MU А0565), Kyiv
- 3rd Separate Signals Brigade (MU А0415), Semipolki, Kyiv Oblast
- 8th Separate Signals Regiment (MU А0707), Haisyn, Vinnytsia Oblast
- 330th Central Nod of the Feldjaeger-Postal [Field Courier] Service (MU А0168), Kyiv
- 1899th Central Base for Repair and Overhaul of Special Signals Equipment (MU А0476), Kyiv

training establishments and units

- Military Institute of Telecommunications and Information Technologies (MILTIT) 'Heroes of Kruty', Kyiv
- Military College for NCO Personnel of the MITIA, Poltava, Poltava Oblast
- 179th Joint Education and Training Center of the Signals Troops (MU А3990), Poltava, Poltava Oblast

under other services and troops

- Signals and Information Systems Center of the Joint Forces Command of the Armed Forces of Ukraine, Kyiv
- Signals and Information Systems directorates directly reporting to headquarters of AFU service branches

=== Unmanned Systems Forces ===
The Unmanned Systems Forces (USF; Ukrainian: Сили безпілотних систем, СБС, romanized: Syly bezpilotnykh system, SBS, lit. '"Pilotless Systems Forces"') is a branch of the Armed Forces of Ukraine.

Ukraine is the first country to have a separate branch of its military dedicated to unmanned systems. The USF was formally established on 11 June 2024, in the midst of the ongoing Russian invasion of Ukraine.

The USF conducts drone warfare using unmanned military robots on land, sea, and air. The USF does not command or control all Ukrainian drones. The Navy, the Marine Corps and the Air Force control their own drone units, as do most of the brigades and units in the various land-based forces (Ground Forces, Air Assault Forces, National Guard, Special Operation Forces, Communications and Cybersecurity Troops, etc) of the Armed Forces of Ukraine.

=== Support Forces ===
Since 1 January 2022, the support forces have the status of a separate joint branch under the General Staff.

Support Forces Command (Military Unit Number А2330), Kyiv

- Central Directorate of the Corps of Engineers of Ukraine (MU А0107), Kyiv
  - 20th Arsenal of the Corps of Engineers (MU А0543), Olshanytsia, Kyiv Oblast and Nizhyn, Chernihiv Oblast
  - 47th Engineer Brigade (MU А2755), Dubno, Rivne Oblast
    - 301st Road Traffic Control Battalion
    - 304th Road Traffic Control Battalion
  - 48th Combat Engineer 'Kamianets-Podilskaya' Brigade (MU А2738), Kamianets-Podilskyi, Khmelnytskyi Oblast
    - 11th Pontoon-Bridging Battalion
    - 308th Engineer Technical Battalion
    - 309th Engineer Technical Battalion
    - 310th Engineer Technical Battalion
    - 311th Engineer Technical Battalion
    - 321st Engineer Battalion
  - 70th Support Regiment (MU А0853), Bar, Vinnytsia Oblast
  - 107th Road Maintenance Center (MU А1519), Dubno, Rivne Oblast
  - 808th Support Regiment (MU А3955), Bilhorod-Dnistrovskyi, Odesa Oblast Oblast
  - 3046th Central Base for Engineer Ammunitions (MU А2647), Malynivka, Kharkiv Oblast
  - Center for Special Engineering Works (MU А1333), Kyiv
- Central Directorate of the Nuclear, Biological, Chemical Defence Troops of the AFU (MU А0108), Kyiv
  - CBRN Surveillance and Analysis Center, Kyiv
  - 704th Regiment of Radiological, Chemical, and Biological Protection (MU А0807), Sambir village, Lviv Oblast
  - 536th Central Base for Repair and Maintenance of CBRN Defence Equipment (MU А0312), Seleshtina-1, Poltava Oblast
- Central Directorate of the Radio-Electronic Warfare Corps of Ukraine (MU А0159), Kyiv
  - 55th Special EW Center (MU А0766), Kyiv and Brovary, Kyiv Oblast
- Central Directorate for Military Topography and Navigation of the Armed Forces (MU А0115), Kyiv
  - 8th Publishing Center of the UAF (MU А0602), Kyiv
  - 13th Photogrammetric Center (MU А3674), Odesa, Odesa Oblast
  - 16th Planning Center for Navigation Support (MU А1423), Kyiv
  - 22nd Military Mapping Unit (MU А1121), Kharkiv, Kharkiv Oblast
  - 64th Topography-Geodesic Center (MU А4127), Shepetivka, Khmelnytskyi Oblast
  - 161st Topography-Geodesic Center (MU А2308), Chernivtsi, Chernivtsi Oblast
  - 115th Mapping Center (MU А3796), Kotsyubynske, Kyiv Oblast
- Hydro-Meteorological Center of the UAF(MU А0204), Kyiv
  - Hydro-meteorological units of the ground forces, air force and navy
- Training units
  - Joint Education and Training Center of the Support Forces (MU А2641), Kamianets-Podilskyi, Khmelnytskyi Oblast

=== Logistical Forces ===
Since 1 January 2022, support forces have the status of a separate joint branch under the General Staff. The logistical forces are mainly organised in two arms – Armaments and Rear Services.

Logistical Forces Command of the Armed Forces of Ukraine (MU А0307), Kyiv

- Command Headquarters
- Armed Forces Armaments and Ordnance Service (MU А2513)
  - Central Support Directorate for Ground Weapons Systems
  - Central Support Directorate for Military Equipment
  - Central Support Directorate for Weapons of Mass Destruction
  - Central Missile Systems and Field and Air Defense Artillery Directorate of the AFU (MU А0120)
  - Central Automobile Directorate of the AFU (MU А0119)
  - Central Armoured Directorate of the AFU (MU А0174)
  - Department for Metrology and Standardization of the AFU (MU А2187)
  - directly reporting military formations of the Armaments Service
- Rear Services of the Armed Forces of Ukraine (MU А2516)
  - Central Support Directorate for Fuel and Lubricants (MU А0125)
  - Central Support Directorate for Food Supply of the AFU (MU А0126)
  - Central Support Directorate for Material Support of the AFU (MU А0127)
  - Central Support Directorate for Resources Supply
  - Central Support Directorate for Technical Equipment and Property
  - Central Support Directorate for Engineering and Infrastructure
  - Central Signals Directorate of the AFU/Signal Corps of Ukraine (MU А0671)
  - military units subordinated to the Rear Services

=== Medical Forces ===
Since 1 January 2022 the support forces have the status of a separate joint branch under the General Staff.

Medical Forces Command (MU А0928), Kyiv

- National Military Medical Clinical Center 'Main Military Clinical Hospital', Kyiv
  - 71st Mobile Military Hospital (MU А0358), Kyiv
  - Military Medical Clinical Center for Professional Patology (MU А2923), Irpin, Kyiv Oblast
  - Central Dental Policlinic, Kyiv
  - Center for Medical Rehabilitation and Sanatorium Treatment 'Pushcha-Voditsya' (MU А1931), Kyiv
- Military Medical Clinical Center of the Central Region (MU А????), Vinnytsia, Vinnytsia Oblast
  - 59th Mobile Military Hospital (MU А0206), Vinnytsia, Vinnytsia Oblast
  - 10th Military Hospital (MU А2339), Khmelnytskyi, Khmelnytskyi Oblast
  - 409th Military Hospital (MU А1065), Zhytomyr, Zhytomyr Oblast
  - 762nd Military Hospital (MU А3122), Bila Tserkva, Kyiv Oblast
  - ?th Military Hospital (MU А3267), Starokonstantyniv, Khmelnytskyi Oblast
  - 1314th Medical Storage (MU А1603), Balki village, Vinnytsia Oblast
  - Center for Medical Rehabilitation and Sanatorium Treatment 'Khmelnyk' (MU А1168), Khmelnyk, Vinnytsia Oblast
- Military Medical Clinical Center of the Southern Region (MU A????), Odesa, Odesa Oblast
  - 38th Military Hospital (MU А4615), Dnipro, Dnipropetrovsk Oblast
  - 61st Military Hospital (MU А0318), Mariupol, Mariupol Oblast
  - 450th Military Hospital (MU А3309), Zaporizhzhia, Zaporizhzhia Oblast
  - 1467th Military Hospital (MU А2428), Mykolaiv, Mykolaiv Oblast
  - 1644th Medical Storage (MU А4619), Hrushyvka village, Mykolaiv Oblast
  - Center for Medical Rehabilitation and Sanatorium Treatment 'Odeskyi', Odesa, Odesa Oblast
- Military Medical Clinical Center of the Northern Region (MU А3306), Kharkiv, Kharkiv Oblast
  - 65th Mobile Military Hospital (MU А0209), Kharkiv, Kharkiv Oblast
  - 9th Military Hospital (MU А4302), Desna, Chernihiv Oblast
  - 387th Garrison Military Hospital (MU А3114), Poltava, Poltava Oblast
  - 407th Military Hospital (MU А3120), Chernihiv, Chernihiv Oblast
- Military Medical Clinical Center of the Western Region, Lviv, Lviv Oblast
  - 66th Mobile Military Hospital (MU А0233), Lviv, Lviv Oblast
  - 376th Military Hospital (MU А1028), Chernivtsi, Chernivtsi Oblast
  - 498th Military Hospital (MU А4554), Lutsk, Volyn Oblast
  - 1121st Policlinic, Ivano-Frankivsk, Ivano-Frankivsk Oblast
  - 1129th Garrison Military Hospital (MU А1446), Rivne, Rivne Oblast
  - 1397th Military Hospital (MU А1047), Mukachevo, Zakarpattia Oblast
  - Center for Medical Rehabilitation and Sanatorium Treatment 'Truskavetskyi' (MU А1700), Truskavets, Lviv Oblast
- Central Sanitary Epidemiologic Directorate (MU А2417), Kyiv
  - 10th Regional Sanitary Epidemiologic Detachment (MU А0972), Kyiv
  - 27th Regional Sanitary Epidemiologic Detachment (MU А4502), Odesa, Odesa Oblast
  - 28th Regional Sanitary Epidemiologic Detachment (MU А4520), Lviv, Lviv Oblast
  - 108th Regional Sanitary Epidemiologic Detachment (MU А4510), Kharkiv, Kharkiv Oblast
  - 740th Regional Sanitary Epidemiologic Detachment (MU А4516), Vinnytsia, Vinnytsia Oblast
- Center for Legal Expertise of the MoD, Kyiv
- 148th Center for Maintenance and Storage of Medical Equipment (MU А0211), Bila Tserkva, Kyiv Oblast
- 149th Center for Maintenance and Storage of Medical Equipment (MU А0503), Berdychiv, Zhytomyr Oblast
- 150th Center for Maintenance and Storage of Medical Equipment (MU А1209), Tokmak, Zaporizhzhia Oblast
- 151st Center for Maintenance and Storage of Medical Equipment (MU А2554), Terentyivka, Poltava Oblast
- 2160th Central Medical Storage (MU А1382), Mankhivka, Cherkasy Oblast
- 4962nd Central Medical Storage (MU А1952), Kyiv

Training establishments and units

- Ukrainian Military Medical Academy, Kyiv

Medical forces under other services and arms

- Medical departments of service branches of the AFU and support formations

=== Military Police ===
Administrative structure:

- Main Directorate of the Military Police (MU А0880), Kyiv, and territorial forces:
  - Central Directorate (direct responsibility over Kyiv and Kyiv Oblast) (MU А2100), Kyiv
  - Western Territorial Directorate (direct responsibility over Lviv Oblast) (MU А0583), Lviv, Lviv Oblast
  - Southern Territorial Directorate (direct responsibility over Odesa Oblast) (MU А1495), Odesa, Odesa Oblast
  - Eastern Territorial Directorate (direct responsibility over Dnipropetrovsk Oblast) (MU А2256), Dnipro, Dnipropetrovsk Oblast

== Personnel ==
=== Education and schools ===
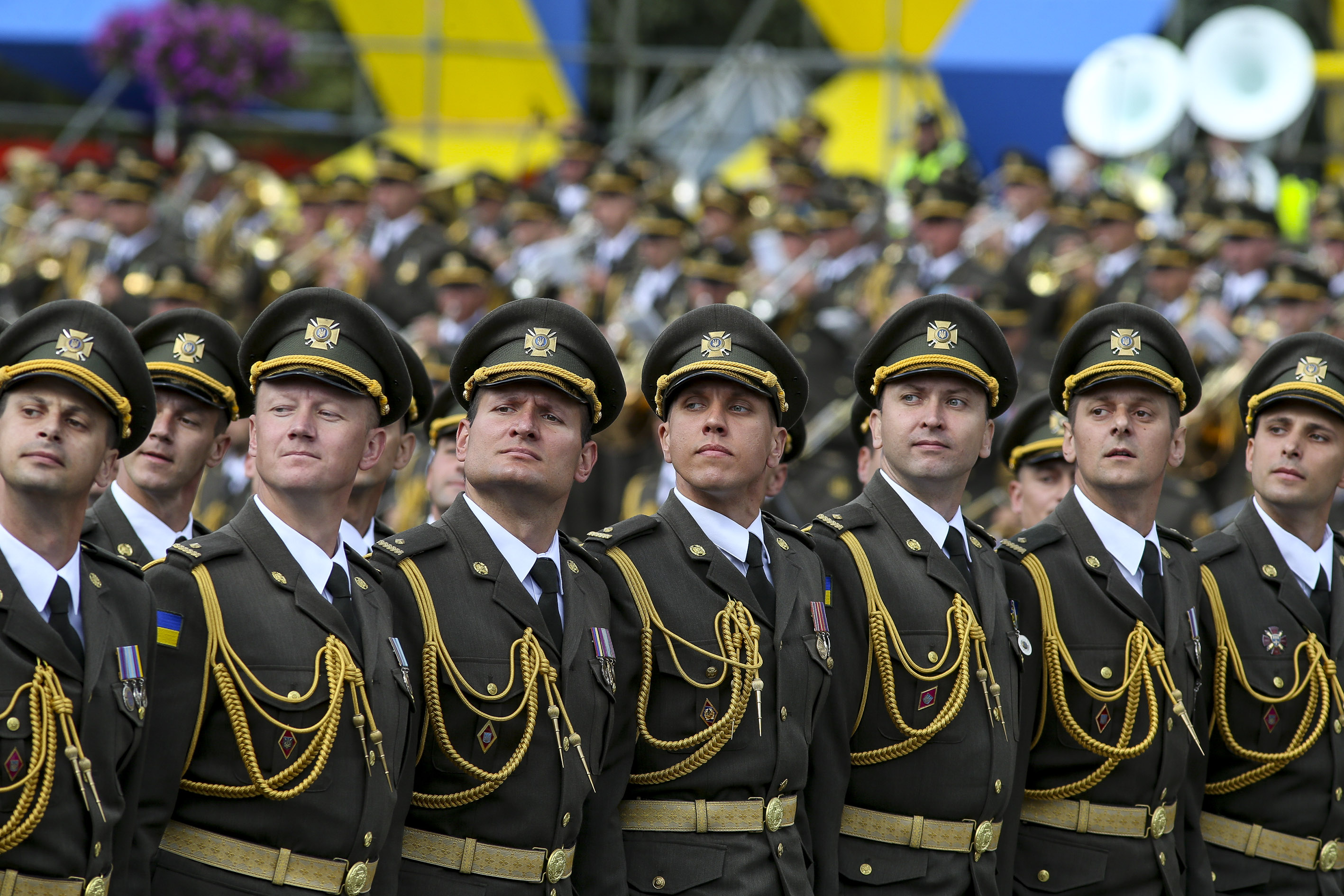
Cadets of the NDUU marching in the 2017 Kyiv Independence Day Parade

A number of universities have specialised military institutes, such as the Faculty of Military Legal Studies at Kharkiv's Yaroslav Mudryi National Law Academy of Ukraine. The primary Ukrainian military academies are:

- Hetman Petro Sahaidachnyi National Ground Forces Academy, Lviv
- Odesa Military Academy, Odesa
- Naval Forces Institute (Ukraine), Mykolaiv
- Ivan Kozhedub National Air Force University, Kharkiv

In addition the National Defence University of Ukraine is in Kyiv.

The Central Hospital of the Armed Forces is located in Kyiv.

The armed forces' military high school is located in Kyiv – the Ivan Bohun Military High School.

=== Contract service ===
In 2017 more than 14 thousand people signed up for contract service with the Armed Forces.

For participating in the war in Donbas, (in May 2017 7.5 thousand) soldiers on the front line receive an average salary of ₴16,000. The minimum maintenance for a contract soldier is ₴7,000.

West Ukraine supplies the fewest military contractors.

=== Conscription ===
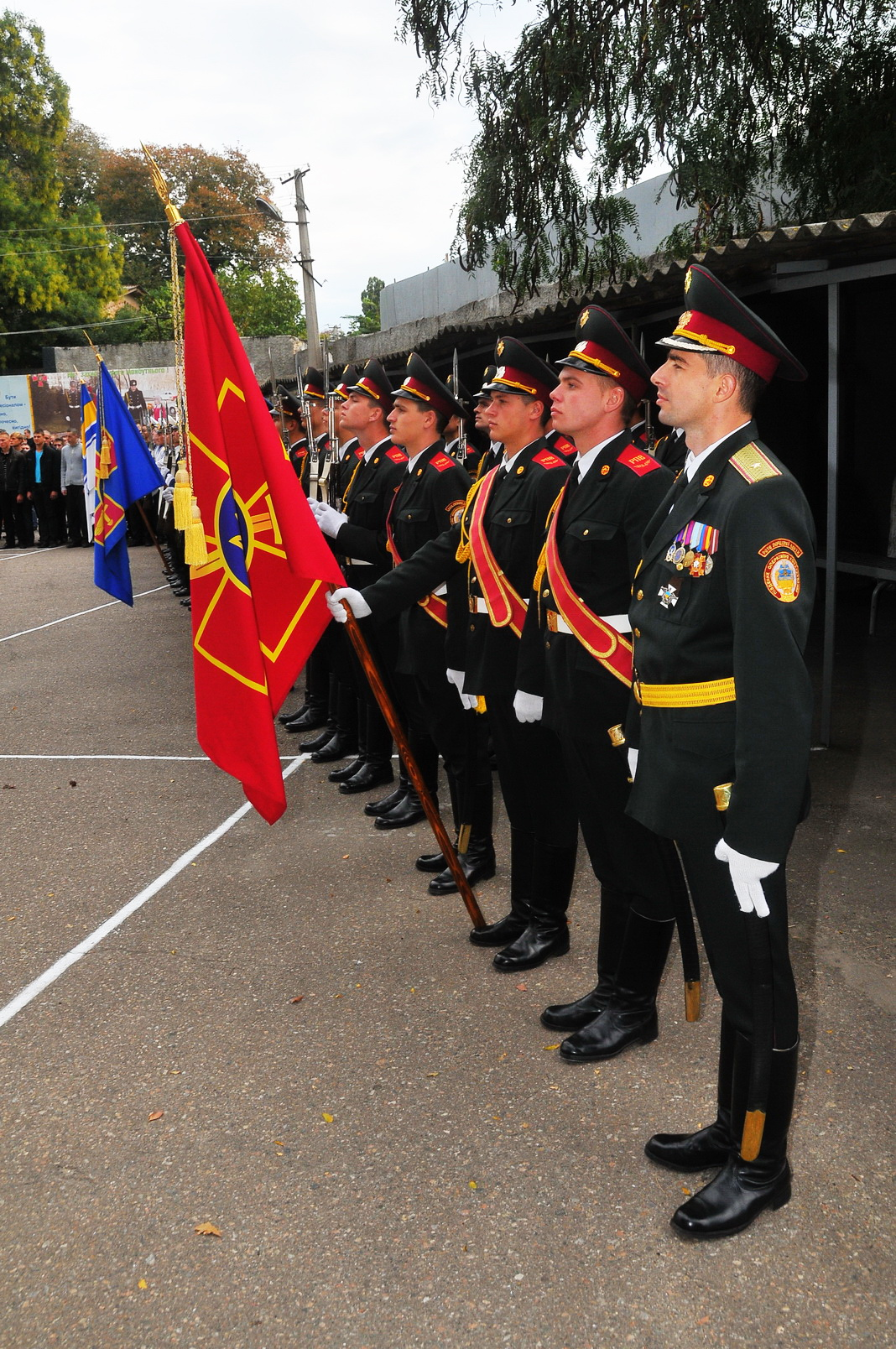
Ukrainian conscripts in 2009

Conscription of men into the armed forces of Ukraine starts at the age of 25. Conscription became a part of the ongoing mobilization that is enforced by press-ganging and rounding up eligible men into the army. This process has become known as "Busification" due to the use of buses by Territorial Recruitment Center officers. The freshly conscripted men are sent to the training centers to prepare for war with Russia.

After serving their term of service, Ukraine's conscripts become part of the inactive reserve and are eligible to be recalled for mobilization in Ukraine until they reach age 55, age 60 for officers. During the war in Donbas, Ukraine instated a partial mobilization to fill needed positions in its armed forces, recalling conscripts who had served before. Because of the war, many conscripts have also been forced to serve longer than their original 18-month term of service. It was planned that in 2015, Ukraine would undergo three waves of partial mobilization, allowing new troops to replace those serving beyond their original term of service.

Women are exempt from conscription, described by some as discrimination against men. Since 1 October 2023, women with medical or pharmaceutical training have been required to register for military service, and those fit to serve are considered liable for military service. Individuals with a moderate autism spectrum disorder are considered eligible for conscription. However, they are assigned to non-combat roles rather than serving on the front line.

Draft dodging is present in Ukraine, as with most nations using the draft. It was reported that between April and August 2014, over 1,000 criminal inquiries into draft evasion were opened in Ukraine. Draft evasion can be problematic because, unless a male citizen was unable to serve for medical reasons, an application to receive an international passport of Ukraine may be denied due to a lack of military service, thus preventing the individual from traveling abroad.

In April 2024, President Zelenskyy signed new conscription laws, passed by the national legislature, that lowered the conscription age by two years, from 27 to 25, and included other provisions that made it easier for the government to conscript eligible persons and harder for draft dodgers to evade conscription. Objections included complaints from families of active service personnel who resented that the laws did not ultimately include an initially considered provision to allow soldiers who had served for 36 months in combat to be relieved and returned home. However, the battle conditions—with Russia advancing with overwhelming force—made it impractical, in the view of Ukraine's leaders, to remove any experienced, active troops from service. Officials pledged the relief provision would be considered in future legislation, without stating when.

According to Ukraine's Prosecutor General's Office, as of September 2025 there have been over 250,000 desertion and AWOL cases opened since the start of Russia's full-scale invasion in 2022, contributing to Ukraine's conscription crisis.

=== Foreign volunteers ===
According to Military Ombudsman Olha Reshetylova as of August 2026, there are around 16,000 foreign volunteers from at least 72 countries serving in the Ukrainian Armed Forces, nearly 40% of which are from South American countries. Many of the Colombian volunteers serving in the Ukrainian Armed Forces are military veterans. Some Colombian sources have reported mistreatment, as well as dangerous assignments leading to high casualties.

Foreign volunteers mainly fight as part of one of the two international legions.

Several foreign volunteers have received awards for acts of bravery during the Russo-Ukrainian war.

=== Role of women ===
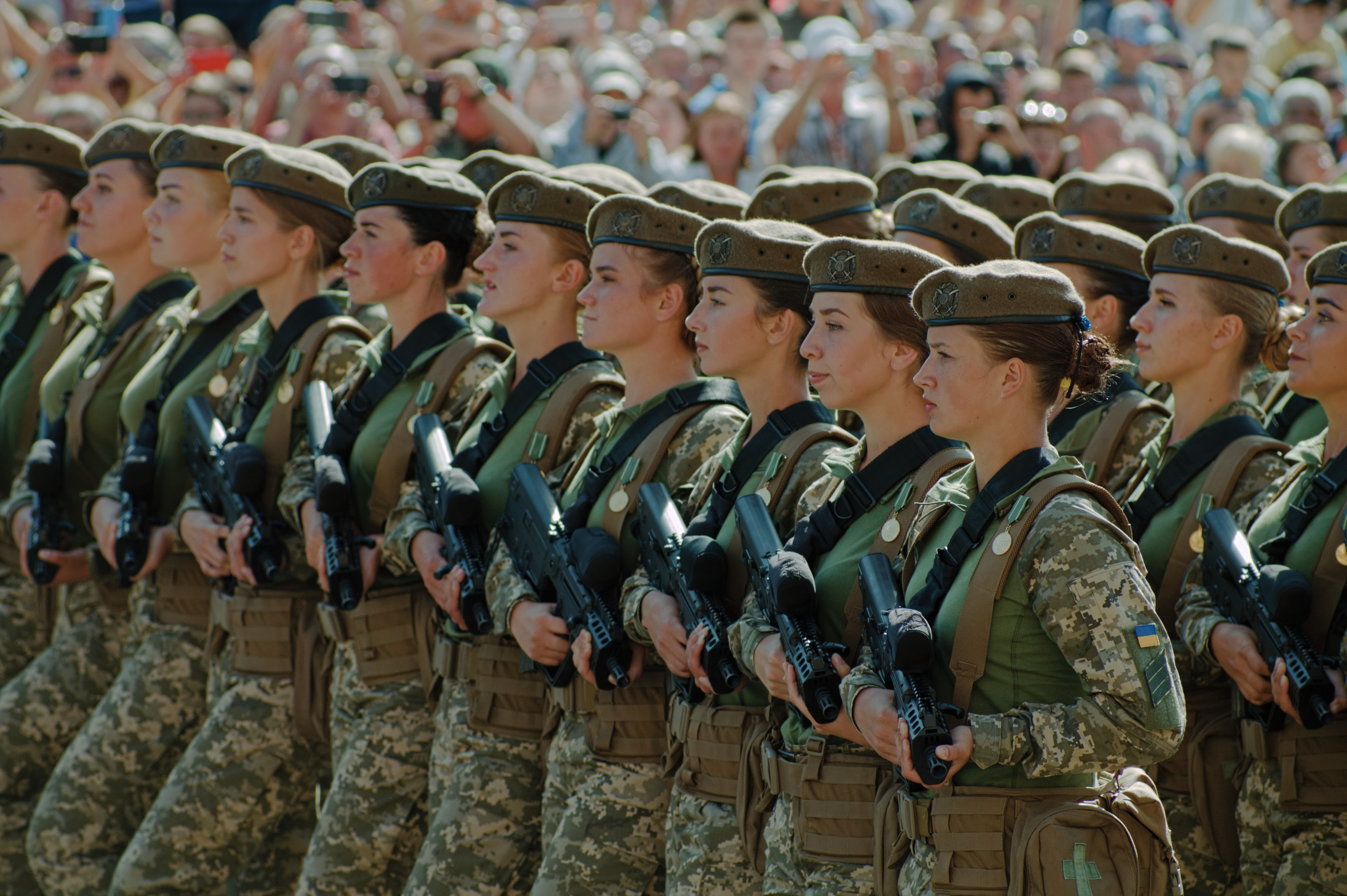
Female military personnel at the 2018 Kyiv Independence Day Parade

Women have been serving in Ukrainian combat units since 2016; they were previously limited to being able to volunteer to join territorial defence battalions. In 2009 women comprised almost 13% of the armed forces (18,000 personnel), but only 1,202 held a high ranking position. According to official figures for June 2016, of the 49,500 women in the Ukrainian military, over 17,000 were military servicewomen (of which more than 2,000 were officers).

In September 2018, legislation was passed to make both women and men equal in the military and law enforcement agencies. The following month Liudmyla Shuhalei, the head of the Military Medical Directorate of the Security Service of Ukraine, became Ukraine's first female general. Since 2019, the Ivan Bohun Military High School accepts both male and female cadets. In 2023, women comprised 4% of officers, and by 2024 the total number of female personnel had increased to 62,000, with over 5,000 having combat roles. By 2026 women officers made up 21% of all officers in the military.

=== Paramilitary forces ===
The National Guard, the Border Guard, the Sea Guard, troops of the SBU, civil defence forces, and the State Transport Special Service come under the Armed Forces' command during wartime.

== Recent operations ==
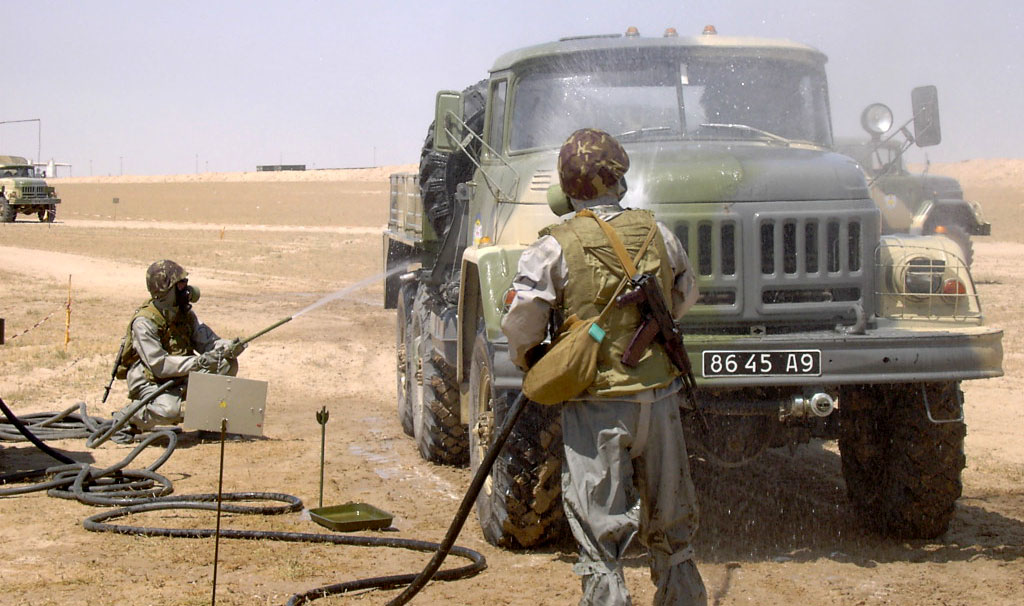
Members of the Ukrainian Army's 19th Nuclear, Biological and Chemical Battalion in Kuwait

Ukraine has been playing an increasingly larger role in peacekeeping operations. Since 1992, over 30,000 soldiers have taken part in missions in the former Yugoslavia (IFOR in Bosnia and Herzegovina, UNPROFOR and UNTAES in Croatia, KFor in Kosovo), the Middle East (Southern Lebanon, Kuwait, Iraq), and Africa (Angola, Sierra Leone, Liberia).

Ukrainian troops—as part of the former Soviet Armed Forces contingent—participated in UNPROFOR in 1992, and in the summer of that year were involved into the civil war in Yugoslavia. On 3 July 1992, the Verkhovna Rada adopted a resolution committing the Ukrainian Armed Forces to UN peacekeeping missions. The Minister of Defence, Kostyantyn Morozov, ordered the creation of the 240th Separate Special Battalion (UKRBAT-1) which was based on the 93rd Guards Motor Rifle Division (now the 93rd Mechanized Brigade). Soon after arrival in Sarajevo on 31 July 1992, the battalion's artillery ended up in the middle of a mutual mortar fight between the Bosnian Serbs and Bosnian Muslims. One of the Serbian shells hit the Ukrainian position, seriously wounding seven soldiers, one of whom died after hospitalisation in Germany.

Since 1997, Ukraine has been working closely with NATO and especially with Poland. A Ukrainian unit was deployed as part of the multinational force in Iraq under Polish command. Ukrainian troops are also deployed as part of the Ukrainian-Polish Battalion (UKRPOLBAT) in Kosovo. The total Ukrainian military deployment around the world as of 1 August 2009 was 540 servicemen participating in 8 peacekeeping missions.

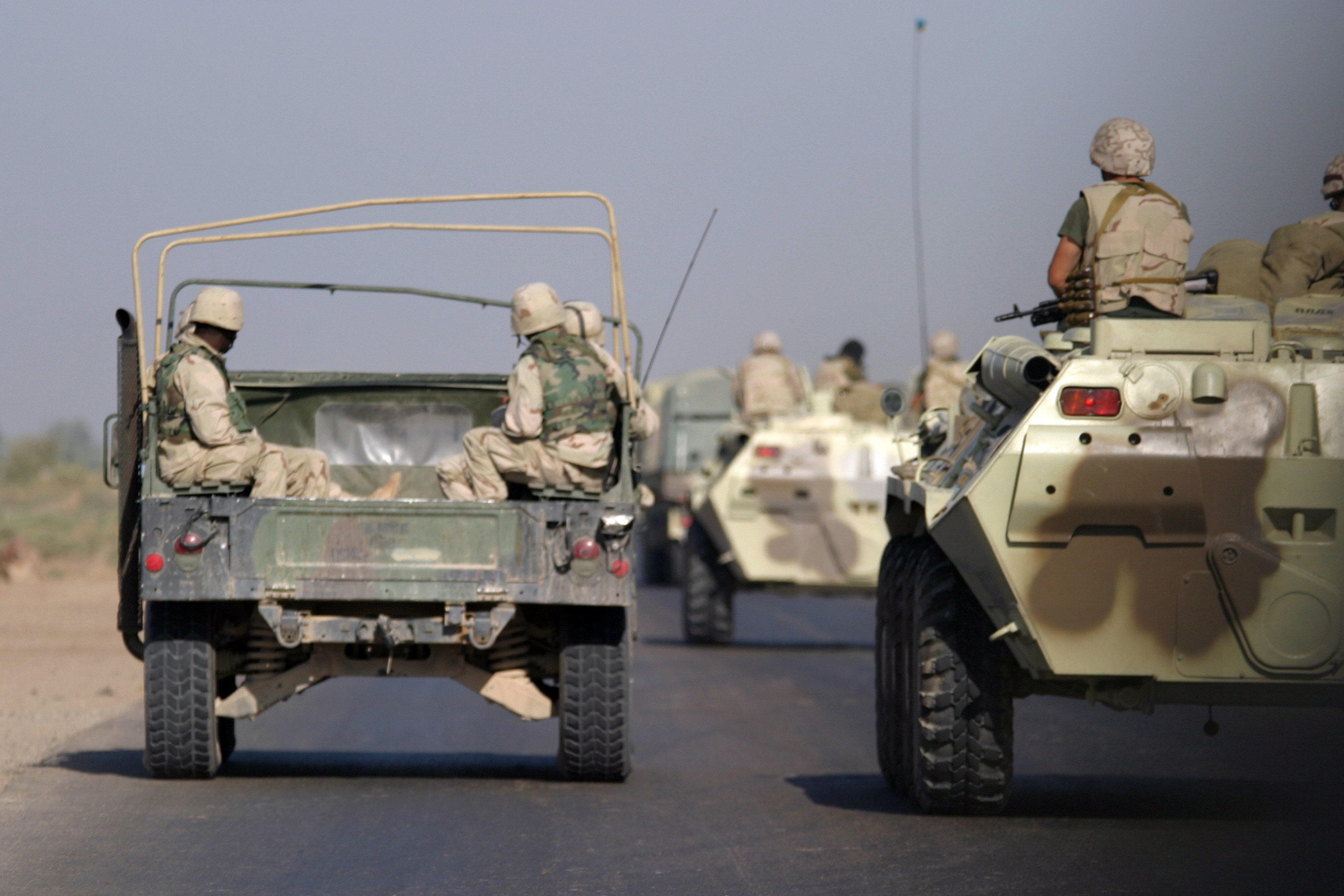
Ukrainian troops riding alongside US Marines in Iraq

In the 2003 Iraq War, from 2003 to 2006, Ukraine supplied one of the largest contingents of troops to the Multinational Force, sending over 1,600 troops to Iraq and neighbouring Kuwait. Thereafter, Ukraine kept around 40 personnel in Iraq until 2008. In all, over 5,000 Ukrainians served in Iraq, with 18 killed in action, and more injured.

The first battle of a regular formation of the Ukrainian Armed Forces happened on 6 April 2004, in Kut, Iraq, when the Ukrainian peacekeeping contingent was attacked by militants of the Mahdi Army. The Ukrainians took fire, and over several hours held the objectives they had been assigned to secure before surrendering the city to insurgents.

Since gaining independence, Ukraine has deployed troops to Iraq, Afghanistan, Kosovo, as well as dedicating peacekeepers to UN missions to Africa (including helicopter units). Ukrainian naval units also participated in anti piracy operations off the coast of Somalia prior to being recalled due to the 2014 Russian intervention in Ukraine.

On 19 January 2015, Ukraine's 18th separate helicopter detachment along with other MONUSCO troops carried out a successful operation eliminating 2 camps belonging to illegal armed groups in the Democratic Republic of the Congo.

=== Deployment outside Ukraine ===
- Democratic Republic of the Congo: (MONUSCO) – 12 Experts on Mission and four Mi-24 helicopters
- Kosovo: (KFOR) – 128 Soldiers
- Kosovo: (UNMIK) – 1 Military Liaison Component Chief of Staff, 1 liaison officer
- Liberia: (UNMIL) – 277 Contingent Troops, 2 Experts on Mission
- Moldova: (Transnistria) – 10 Military Observers
- Sudan: (UNMIS) – 9 Experts on Mission
- Mali (20)

=== Annexation of Crimea by Russia ===
On 2 March 2014, the Ukrainian Armed Forces were placed on full alert following a Russian military invasion of Crimea. On 19 March 2014, Ukraine drew plans to withdraw all its troops and their families to the mainland "quickly and efficiently".

== Traditions ==
- On 9 August 2018, President Petro Poroshenko announced that the battle cry Glory to Ukraine will be the official greeting of the armed forces, replacing the Soviet era military greeting of Hello Comrades (Вітаю товариші, Vitayu tovaryshi). The greeting was first used during the Kyiv Independence Day Parade that year celebrating the centennial of the Ukrainian state. It is also the official greeting of the National Police of Ukraine.
- The Central House of Officers of the Armed Forces of Ukraine is the cultural centre of the Ukrainian military located in Kyiv. Since its recent reorganisation, it has become one of the leading cultural centres in the Ukrainian capital. It served as a concert hall for military officers in the post-war years, during which the whole city of Kyiv was in ruins and there were practically no audience halls. It has hosted the National Military History Museum since October 1995.
- The Ukrainian Army unveiled its current uniform on Independence Day in 2016. The new uniforms were modelled on British and Polish military styles and incorporate details from the uniforms worn by the Ukrainian People's Army. The cap includes an insignia of a Ukrainian Cossack grasping a cross. Although mainly designed for the ground forces, other branches based their new uniforms off of the update. Prior to 2016, the uniforms were based on the Soviet military precedent.
- The military uses the Soviet goosestep (originated from Prussia that under the orders of King Frederick the Great) with the speed of the step being 75 steps per minute and elements of the marching pace of the Sich Riflemen.
- When in the present arms position, all unit colours are required to dip.
- The S. Tvorun arrangement of the Zaporizhian March has been used in the ZSU since 1991 when it replaced Farewell of Slavianka in being performed during recruiting days, when new servicemen are welcomed to the Armed Forces and recite their enlistment oaths.

== Budget ==
In 2017, Ukraine's National Security Strategy foresaw that its National Security and Defense budget should be at least 5% of Ukraine's GDP.

On 21 December 2016, the Verkhovna Rada adopted its 2017 National Security and Defense budget worth $5.172 billion; that being 5% of Ukraine's GDP. In 2016 defence expenditures amounted to $4.4 billion, or 5% of the GDP. This (2016 figure) was a 23% increase from 2013 and a 65% increase from 2005. From the total, 60% was budgeted to be spent on defence and 40% on security and policing. 2016 also saw a 30% increase in weapons development spending.

By 2014, corruption, historically widespread in Ukraine, combined with small budgets left the military in such a depleted condition that their ability to confront the crisis in Crimea and the Donbas was minimal. All Ukrainian defence sectors were heavily affected by systemic corruption which is hindering its capacity to ensure national security. In addition, it undermined popular trust in the military as an institution. Despite great effort to resolve the issue there were signs that enough is not being done.

The Ukrainian government launched major structural reforms of the army to meet NATO standards by 2020, but few believed that it could successfully meet the deadline. Some of the problems remained intact, for example: lack of civilian and parliamentary control of the armed forces, lack of internal coordination between different departments, poor integration of volunteers into the regular army, impunity and abusive behaviour of military personnel in conflict zones and systemic corruption and opacity of financial resources, especially in the Ukroboronprom defence-industry monopoly.

In 2018, the military budget grew dramatically, to nearly 5% of GDP. Corruption remained a serious problem operating at all levels of Ukrainian society, and the lack of modern military organisational structure confounded efforts at reform. By 2022, some reforms had been made.

=== Budget per year ===
(Defence budget only, not "Security and Defense" combined)

- 2003: $1.01 billion (₴5.06 billion @5.0 exchange rate)
- 2004: $1.29 billion (₴6.46 billion @5.0 exchange rate)
- 2005: $1.23 billion (₴6.16 billion @5.0 exchange rate)
- 2006: $1.47 billion (₴7.35 billion @5.0 exchange rate)
- 2007: $2.12 billion (₴10.6 billion @5.0 exchange rate)
- 2008: $1.78 billion (₴8.926 billion @5.0 exchange rate)
- 2009: $0.93 billion (₴7.4 billion @8.0 exchange rate)
- 2010: $1.63 billion (₴13.1 billion @8.0 exchange rate)
- 2011: $1.82 billion (₴14.6 billion @8.0 exchange rate)
- 2012: $2.05 billion (₴16.4 billion @8.0 exchange rate)
- 2013: $1.88 billion (₴15.3 billion @8.1 exchange rate)
- 2014: $1.37 billion (₴15.1 billion @11.0 exchange rate)
- 2015: $1.91 billion (₴40.2 billion @21.0 exchange rate)
- 2016: $2.11 billion (₴56 billion)
- 2017: $2.65 billion (₴69 billion)
- 2018: $3.2 billion (₴83.3 billion)
- 2019: $4.08 billion (₴102 billion)
- 2020: $5.2 billion (₴130 billion)
- 2021: $4.9 billion (₴121.7 billion)
- 2022: $8.3 billion (₴340.1 billion)
- 2023: $31.03 billion (₴1.1 trillion)
- 2024: $64.8 billion (₴2.4 trillion)
- 2025: $70.86 billion (₴2.96 trillion)
- 2026: $120 billion (₴5 trillion)

"Security and Defense" combined budget apart from Department of Defense (Defence Ministry) for Armed Forces of Ukraine, also includes expenses for Police, Customs, and Border Control.

== Military holidays ==
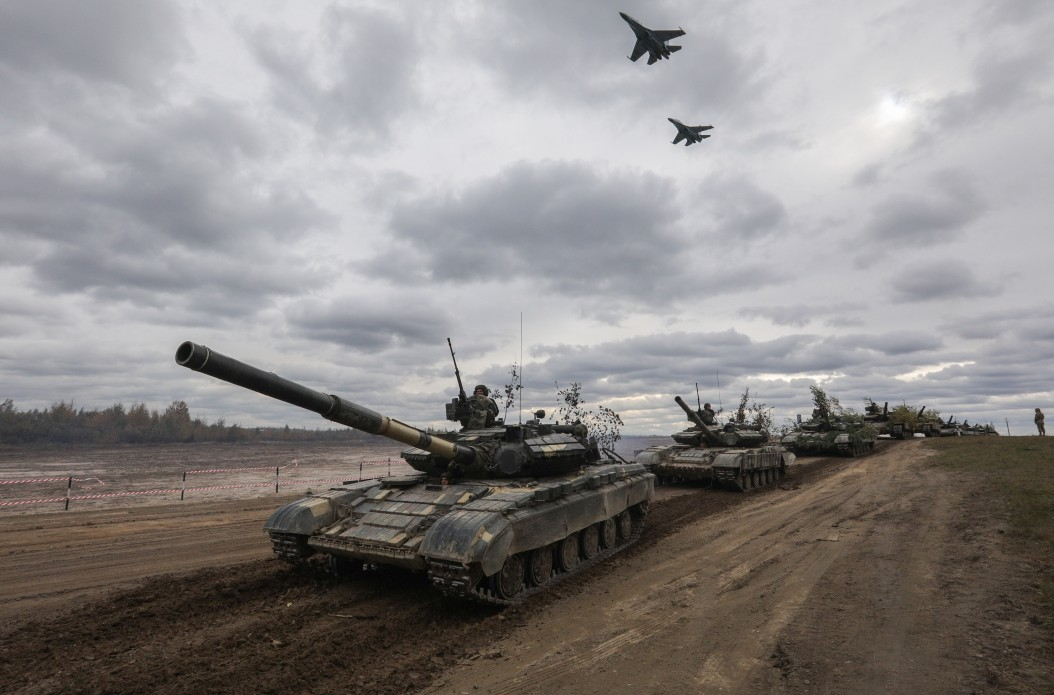
T-64 and Su-27 on Defender of Ukraine Day celebration, 14 October 2017

These are the military holidays observed by all service personnel in the Armed Forces of Ukraine.

- 6 May – Day of the Mechanised Infantry
- 23 May – Marine Corps Birthday
- 8 July – Air and Air Defence Forces Day
- First Sunday in July – Navy Day; From 1997 until 2011 this day was celebrated on 1 August
- 8 August – Signal Corps Day
- 7 September – Military Intelligence Forces Day
- 9 September – Armoured Forces Day
- 14 September – Mobilised Servicemen Day
- 1 October – Defenders Day
- 29 October – Finance Officers Day
- 3 November – Rocket Forces and Artillery Day
- 3 November – Corps of Engineers Day
- 8 November – Air Assault Forces Day
- 6 December – :Armed Forces Day; festive fireworks and salutes take place in various cities in Ukraine The holiday was established in 1993 by the Verkhovna Rada.
- 12 December – Ground Forces Day
- 23 December – Operational Servicemen Day

== Veterans ==
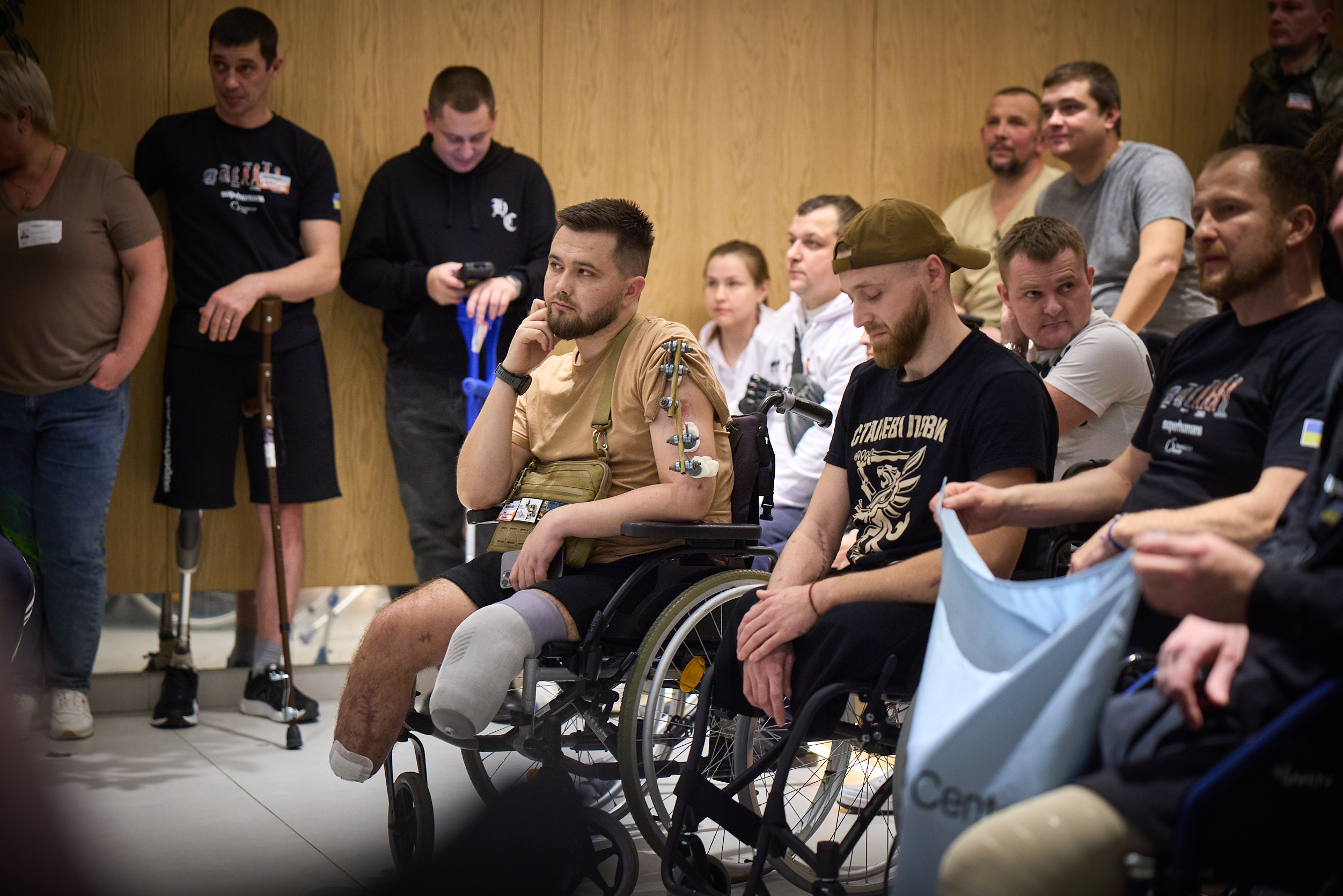
Veterans at the Superhumans Center in Vynnyky in 2024

Military personnel who served in wars and military operations are eligible for benefits. These include allowances, discounts on medical services, free use of public transportation, additional vacation days from work, retention priority in work layoffs, easier access to loans, preference when applying for security-related work, priority when applying to vocational or trade schools, and electricity, gas, and housing subsidies. Veterans can be eligible to stay at military sanatoriums. In 2014, the government extended veteran benefits to Ukrainian troops who participating in the war in Donbas. Foreign veterans residing in Ukraine can apply for some of the listed benefits. On 22 November 2018, Iryna Friz was appointed as the first minister for Veterans Affairs.

Veteran groups are not as developed as in the United States, which has numerous well known national organisations such as the Veterans of Foreign Wars. World War II veterans, and even persons who have lived through the war are generally treated with the highest respect. Other veterans are not as well known. Ukrainian veterans from the Soviet–Afghan War are strikingly similar to the Vietnam War veterans of the United States. The Soviet Union generally kept the public in the dark through the war, and it has often been labelled as a mistake by the Soviet Union and its successor states. The lack of media coverage and censorship through the war also ensured that many still remain unaware of their nation's involvement in the conflict. Despite Ukraine having the third-largest contingent of troops in Iraq in 2004, few also realise that their nation has many veterans of the Iraq War.

Due to the ongoing conflict with Russia, another generation of veterans has appeared in Ukraine. These veterans would be eligible for the same benefits as all others. However, as there was no official declaration of war, it was difficult to determine the cut-off date for veteran benefits, leaving many that participated at the beginning of the conflict without benefits. At first, Ukraine only gave benefits posthumously to family members, as there was no legal framework to account for the veterans, moreover, members of territorial defence battalions were not eligible for benefits at all. In August, a law was passed granting all service members participating in the war in Donbas the status of veterans, five months after first hostilities broke out in Crimea, the territorial defence battalions were integrated into the National Guard making them part of Ukraine's forces, thus allowing their volunteers to receive veteran status.

Veterans of the war in Donbas are eligible for receiving apartments (if staying in active duty) or a land plot for building purposes of 1,000 sq. metres in the district of their registration.

== Defence industry ==
The newly-independent state of Ukraine inherited about 30% of the military industries of the Soviet Union. This included between 50–60 per cent of Ukrainian commercial enterprises that at the time employed 40% of Ukraine's working population.

Ukraine's defence industry has continued to be a strategically important sector and a large employer. Before the start of the Russo-Ukrainian war, most of the country's manufactured arms were mostly exported. Such exports were banned after the outbreak of the full-scale invasion, but in September 2025 it was announced that controlled exports of surplus arms would be permitted.

== See also ==
- Flags of the Ukrainian Armed Forces
- Ukrainian Armed Forces branch insignia
