= 37th Communications Regiment (Ukraine) =

37th Separate Communications Regiment
- 37-й окремий полк зв'язку
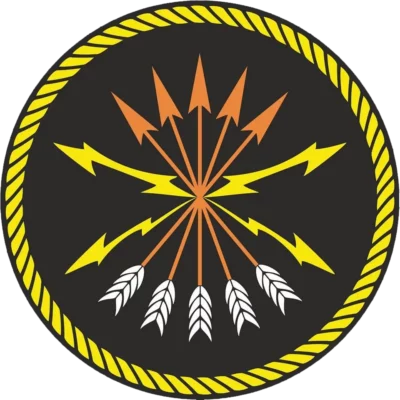
- Regiment Insignia
- Active: 1999 - present
- Country: Ukraine
- Branch: Ukrainian Navy
- Type: Regiment
- Role: Communications
- Part of: Ukrainian Navy
- Garrison/HQ: Odesa
- Nickname: Crimean Communication
- Engagements: Russo-Ukrainian War: Russian invasion of Crimea; 2022 Russian Invasion of Ukraine

Insignia
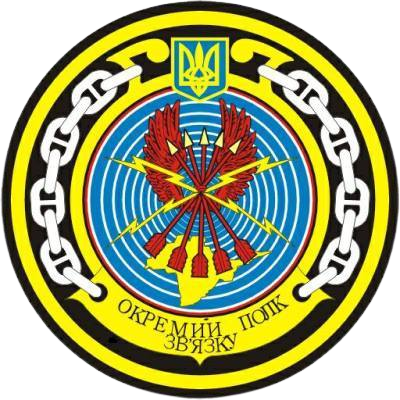
- Former Insignia

37th Separate Communications Regiment is a Regiment of the Ukrainian Navy concerned with communications and connections between different units of the Ukrainian Navy. It was established in 1999 in Crimea but after Russian invasion of Crimea, it was relocated to Odesa.

== History ==
It was established in 1999 as the 37th Separate Communications Regiment in Crimea.

In 2014, after the Russian invasion of Crimea, the headquarters of the regiment were transferred to Odesa after the renovations of a former military installation.

On 6 December 2021, the regiment was officially presented with a Combat Flag.

== Structure ==
- Headquarters
- Communication Centre
- Logistics
- Communication Museum
- Medical Center

== Sources ==
- "Убитую" воинскую часть ВМСУ А-3821 отремонтировали для крымского полка связи.
- 37- окремий полк зв'язку ВМС (Одеса)
- Військовослужбовці 37 окремого полку зв’язку ВМС тепло привітали своїх бойових подруг з 8 березня
- 17 річниця окремого полку зв'язку ВМС України.
- Окремий полк зв’язку ВМС на Одещині
- "Харчування військовослужбовців окремого полку зв'язку ВМС ЗС України за новим Каталогом продуктів". mil.gov.ua/. Ministry of Defense of Ukraine. 2018-05-07. Archived from the original on 8 May 2018.
