= Liudmyla Shuhalei =

Ukrainian major general

- Native name: Людмила Миколаївна Шугалей
- Born: 21 March 1965 (age 61); Chernihiv, Ukrainian SSR, Soviet Union (now Ukraine)
- Allegiance: Ukraine
- Branch: Security Service of Ukraine
- Service years: 1995–present
- Rank: Major general
- Commands: Military Medical Department of the Security Service of Ukraine
- Alma mater: Kyiv Medical University

Liudmyla Mykolaivna Shuhalei (Ukrainian: Людми́ла Микола́ївна Шугале́й; born 21 March 1965) is a Ukrainian major general currently serving as director of the Military Medical Department of the Security Service of Ukraine. She is Ukraine's first military female general and second female general overall (after Tetiana Podashevska of the Militsiya), having been appointed in 2018.

== Biography ==
Liudmyla Mykolaivna Shuhalei was born on 21 March 1965 in the city of Chernihiv, in northern Ukraine (though other sources have incorrectly described her as being from Kyiv). She graduated From Kyiv Medical University (now Bogomolets National Medical University) and worked in the civilian sector before joining the Security Service of Ukraine as a therapist in 1995. Prior to 2014, she was deputy director of the Military Medical Department of the Security Service of Ukraine. At the time, she held the rank of colonel.

Shuhalei was an active participant in Euromaidan, providing medical assistance to protesters injured by security forces. Following the protests, she became director of the Military Medical Department.

On 12 October 2018, Shuhalei was promoted to the rank of major general by decree of Petro Poroshenko, making her the first female military general and the second female general overall in Ukraine's history, after Tetiana Podashevska of the Militsiya. Following her promotion, there were several incorrect reports in Ukrainian media that Shuhalei was the first female Ukrainian general ever. Ukrainian media widely celebrated Shuhalei's promotion, though Poroshenko was subject to some criticism that he had done the move as a political stunt.

Shuhalei continues to be head of the Military Medical Department of the Security Service of Ukraine, as of 2023.
