= Women in the Ukrainian military =

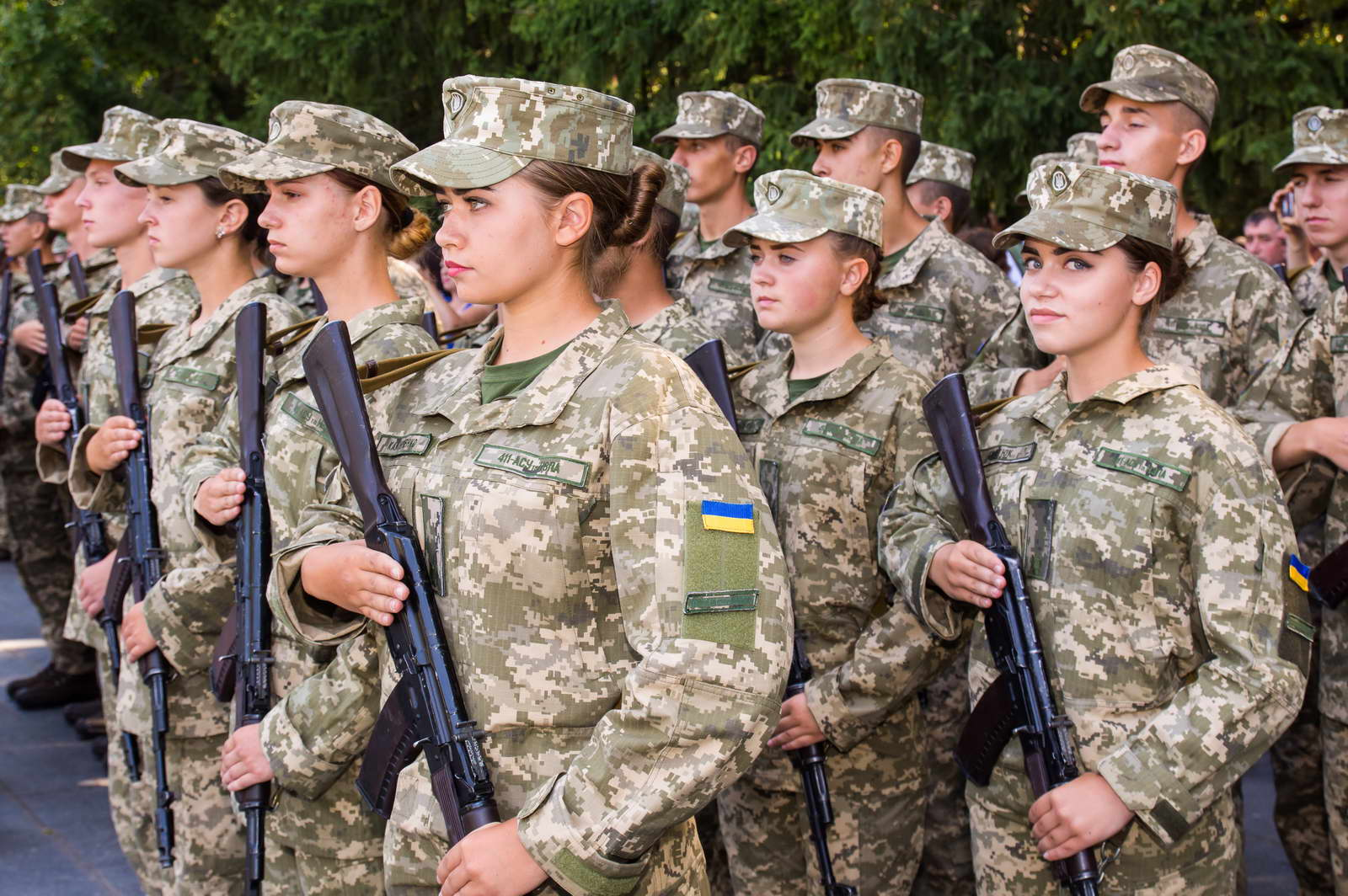
First-year students of the Kharkiv National Air Force University on the day of taking their military oath of loyalty to the Ukrainian people (2018)

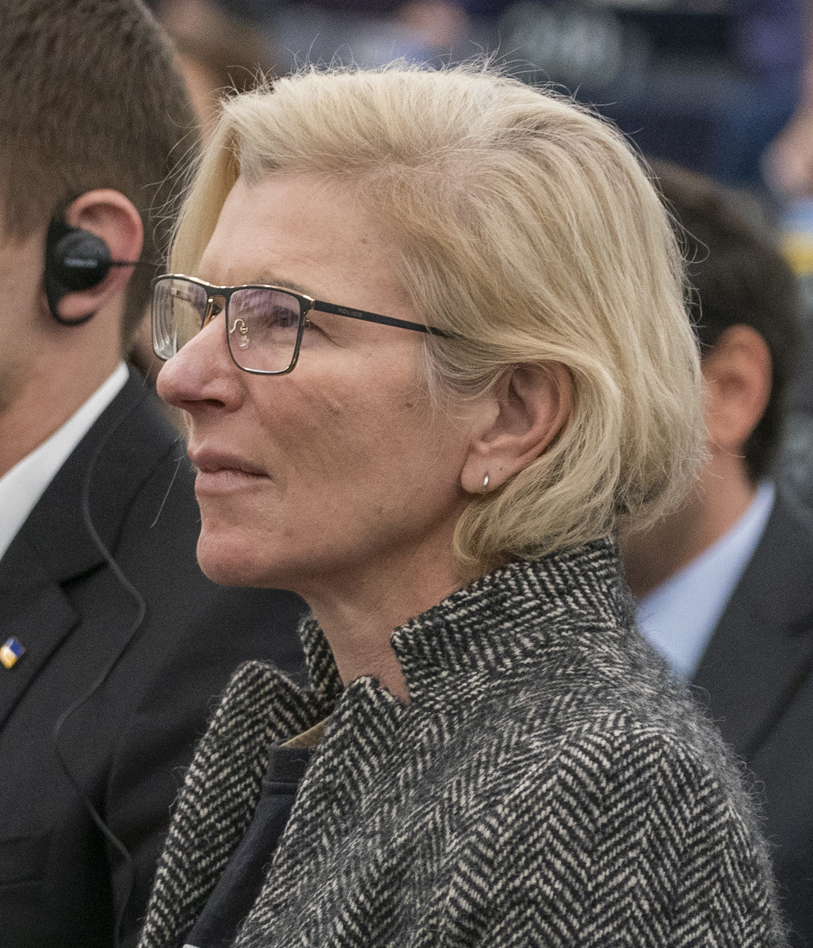
Yuliia Paievska, paramedic, founder of the "Taira's Angels" evacuation medical unit. Spending March–June 2022 in Russian captivity, she became a symbol of bravery and sacrifice.

Women have played active roles in the Revolution of Dignity, the war in Donbas, and the ongoing Russian invasion of Ukraine.

Since 2014, women have reported discrimination and gender equality within the Armed Forces of Ukraine (ZSU), with projects to counteract this such as Invisible Battalion.

Initially restricted to traditional female roles such as nurses and rear echelon radio operators, gradually, after the February 2022 invasion, the Ukraine government introduced rules that allowed women to drive trucks in combat zones, to serve in the infantry as drone operators, machine gunners, or snipers, to become tank commanders and in Ukraine’s special forces. Women have been deployed on combat operations in southeastern Ukraine for several months.

== Number of women in the Ukrainian military ==
=== Personnel statistics ===
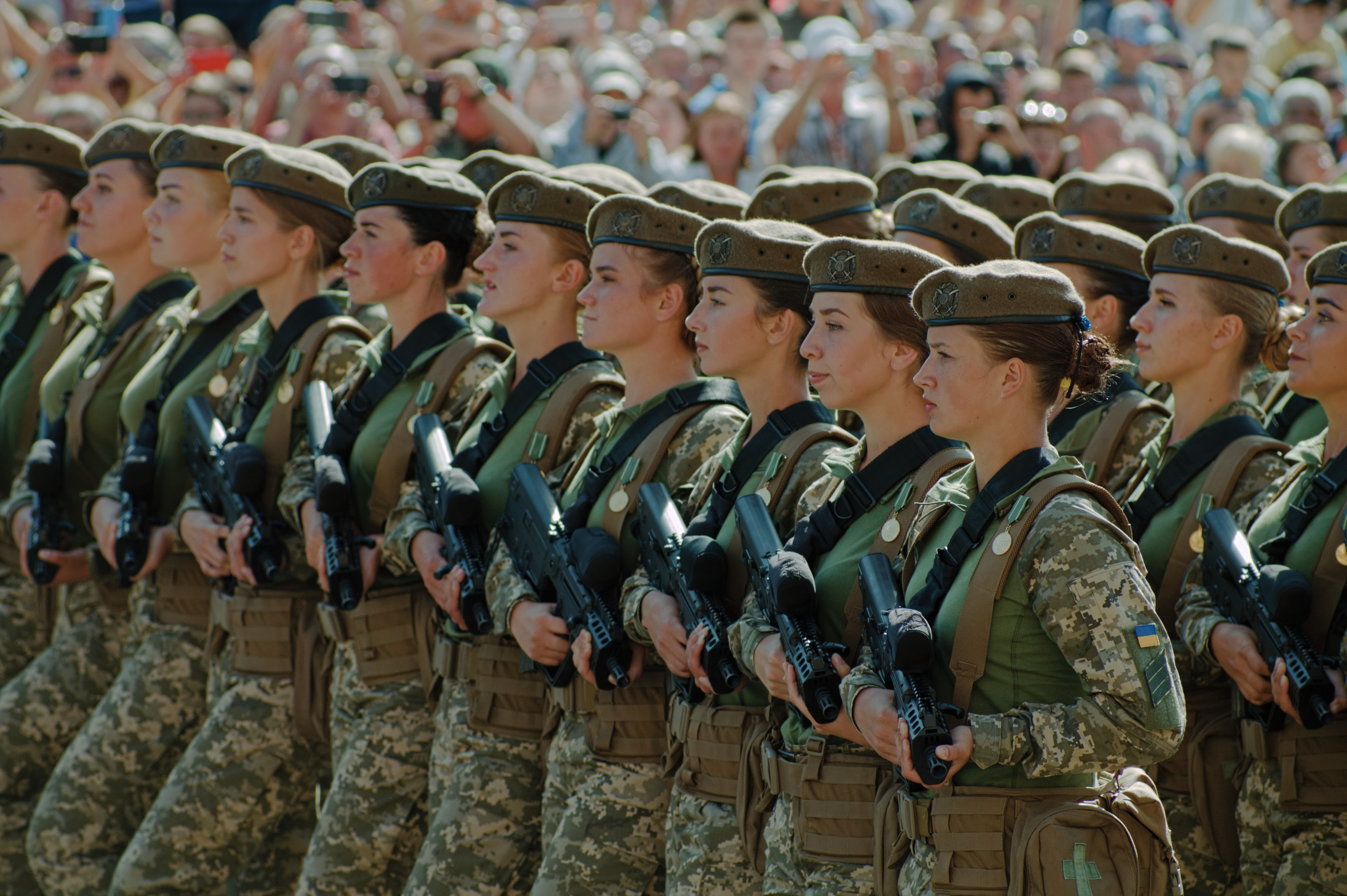
2018 military parade on the Independence Day of Ukraine

Since 2013, the number of women in the Armed Forces has been growing steadily: as of May 2021, there were twice as many women in the military as in 2013. The number of female officers has almost tripled (5,000), and the number of female cadets has almost quadrupled. Between 2014 and March 2023, the number of female military personnel in the ZSU increased 2.5-fold (from 16,557 to 42,898), while the number of female officers rose to 7,416, almost a sevenfold increase compared to 2014. In the same period, the number of women employed as civilian personnel decreased from 33,369 to 17,640; the net total number of women employed in both military and civilian professions in the ZSU increased by 10,612.

Since the beginning of the Russian large-scale invasion of Ukraine in February 2022, more than 11,000 women have joined the Armed Forces of Ukraine of their own free will. This was announced by the commander of the ZSU Joint Operational Headquarters Serhii Naiev: "From the first day of the war, women, along with men, have been queuing up at territorial recruitment centres to join the defence of our homeland. They chose the most dangerous specialities, joining the ranks of grenade launchers, machine gunners, riflemen and snipers, sometimes having ... a desire to become tank gunners, to be part of the gun and mortar crew."

As of 22 June 2023, Ukrainian women soldiers served in the following military branches:

- Ukrainian Ground Forces (SV ZSU): more than 16,000 women,
- Ukrainian Air Force (PS ZSU): more than 7,000 women,
- Ukrainian Navy (VMS ZSU): almost 2,000 women,
- Ukrainian Air Assault Forces (DShV): almost 1,000 women,
- Territorial Defence Forces (TDF): over 3,000 women,
- and other components of the Defence Forces.

On 23 September 2026, in response to an inquiry by the Kyiv Independent, the Ukrainian General Staff]l said that over 76,000 women served in the Ukrainian military. 57,000 in combat positions, the rest in civilian positions.

=== In commanding positions in the military ===
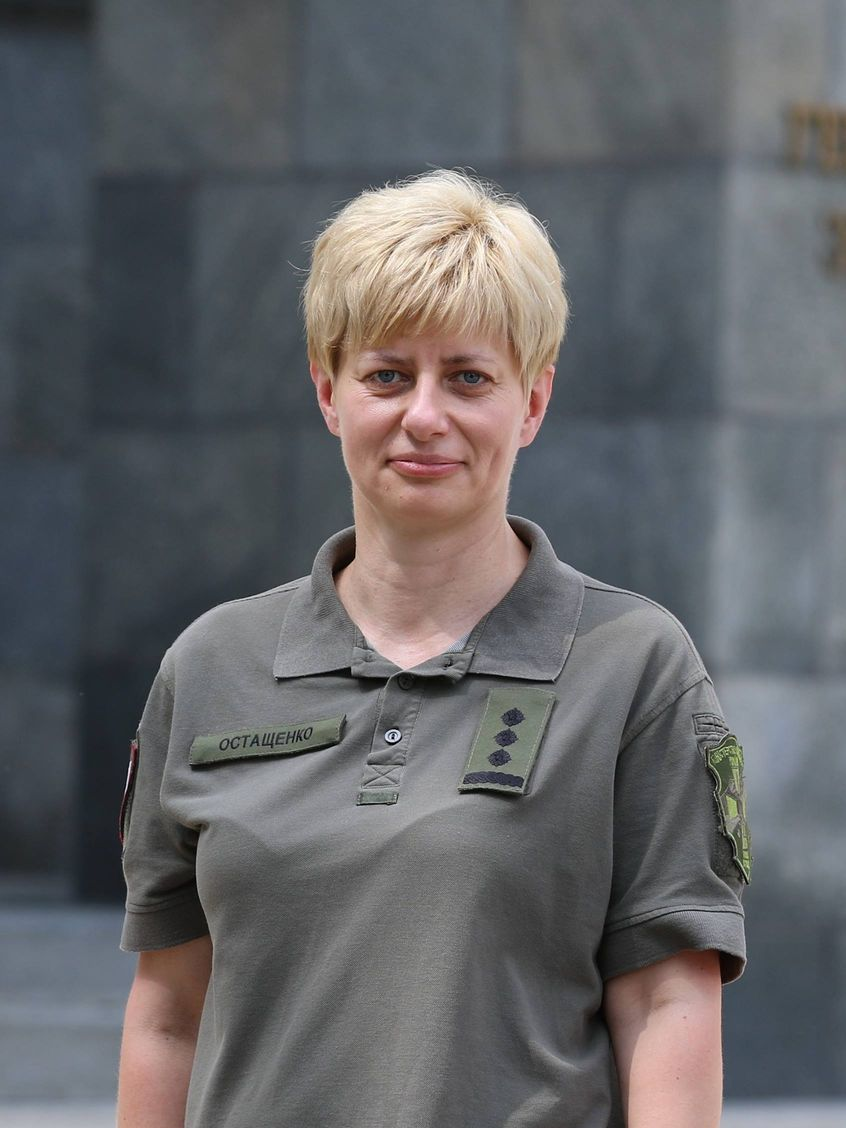
Tetiana Ostashchenko, the first female ZSU branch commander, with the rank of Brigadier general

In 2004, the Interior Ministry spokeswoman Tetyana Podashevska was promoted to the (civilian) rank of major general of the Militsiya (precursor to the current National Police of Ukraine)." On 12 October 2018, Liudmyla Shuhalei became the first woman to receive the (military) rank of major general of the Military Medical Department of the Security Service of Ukraine (SBU) (Ukrainian: Військово медичне управління Служби безпеки України, romanized: Vijs'kovo medychne upravlinnja Sluzhby bezpeky Ukrajiny). The first female branch commander of the Medical Forces of the Armed Forces of Ukraine (Ukrainian: Медичні сили Збройних Сил України), Tetiana Ostashchenko, was appointed on 30 July 2021, becoming the first female commander of a separate branch in the history of the Armed Forces of Ukraine (ZSU), and the first female Brigadier General.

As of 26 February 2021, 925 servicewomen served in commanding positions. As of December 2021, more than 800 women commanded units and platoons. As of March 2023, the share of women in leadership positions was 11%. According to a Ministry of Defence representative, the positive dynamics indicated that the Armed Forces were making significant progress thanks to the Ministry's systematic work on gender issues.

As of January 2026, women made up 21% of officers in the military.

=== Participants in hostilities ===
Women are actively involved in hostilities. As of March 2021, more than 10% of the total number of personnel involved in the Joint Forces Operation (JFO) forces and facilities in Donetsk Oblast and Luhansk Oblast were women, said Viktoria Arnautova, the Adviser to the Commander-in-Chief of the Armed Forces of Ukraine on Gender Issues.

More than 13,000 women received the status of "participant in hostilities" (Ukrainian: Учасник бойових дій, romanized: Uchasnyk bojovyx dij; feminine Ukrainian: Учасниця, romanized: Uchasnytsja), the official legal term for "veteran" in Ukraine, for participation in the Anti-Terrorist Operation in Eastern Ukraine (14 April 2014 – 30 April 2018) and the Joint Forces Operation (30 April 2018 – 24 February 2022) as of March 2021, and more than 16,700 as of December 2021.

== History ==
=== War in Donbas ===
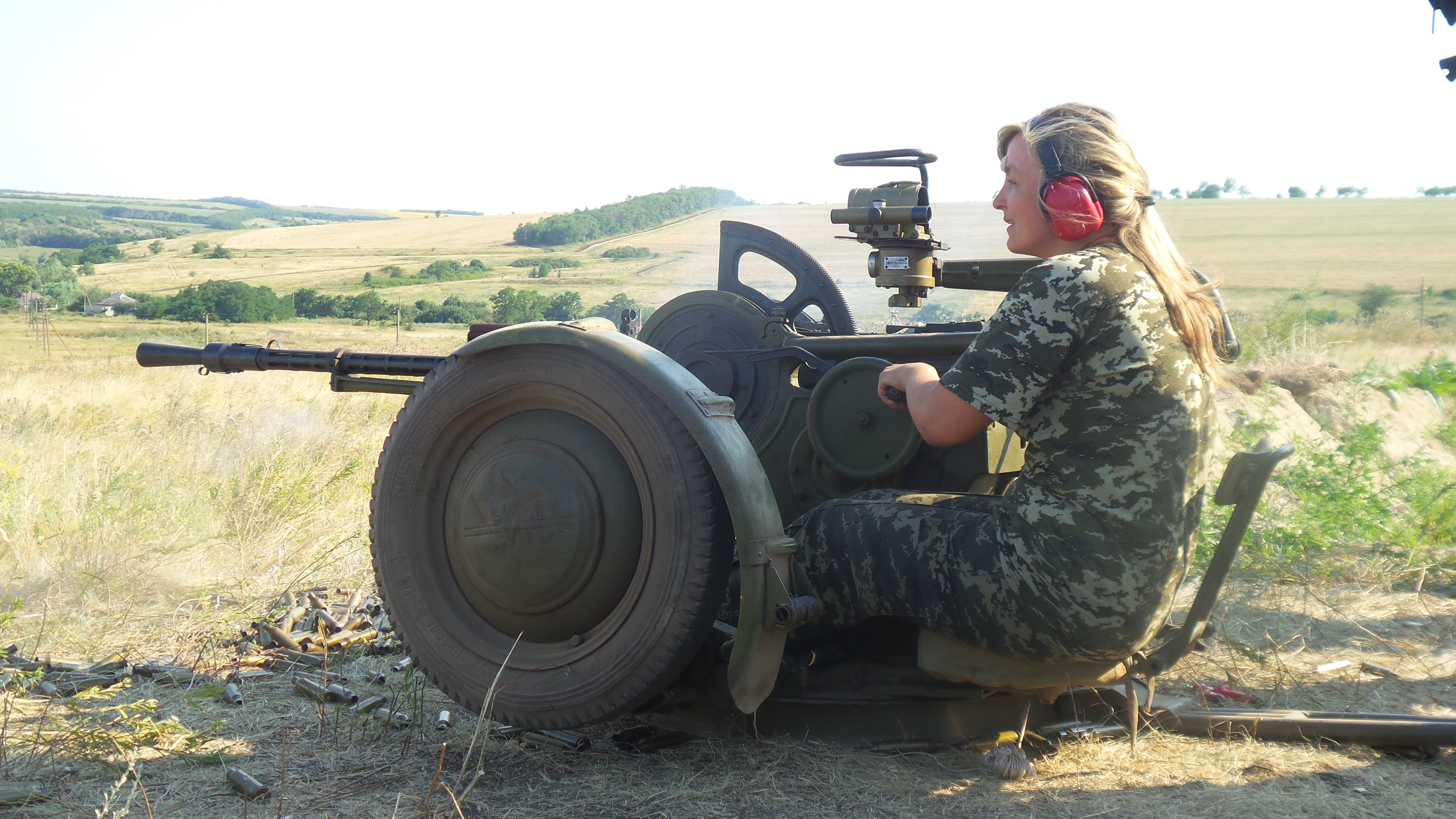
Female soldier operating a ZPU-1 anti-aircraft gun in the Aidar Battalion, Luhansk Oblast, August 2014

The war has seen a significant increase in the number of women serving in the Ukrainian military, with several positions that had been reserved for men only being opened up to women. By 2016, 8.5 percent of the Ukrainian military were women and by March 2021, the percentage of women in the armed forces had risen to 22.8 percent, 15.5% of them described by the Ukrainian Ministry of Defence as "service-personnel".

The Ukrainian Center for Drone Intelligence, which builds drones for the Ukrainian army and provides training courses for drone warfare, was founded by Maria Berlinska, who had volunteered to serve on the front after graduating from university.

A number of women soldiers have achieved high levels of public prominence during the war. Nadiya Savchenko, a fighter pilot who volunteered for the Aidar Battalion after her regular battalion was not deployed to the front, was named a Hero of Ukraine and elected to the Ukrainian Parliament after being captured by the Luhansk People's Republic.

Women have also featured in military propaganda in the war. In May 2014, Donetsk People's Republic Defence Minister Igor Girkin posted an online video calling for recruits, stating that "if men are not capable of this, we will have to call on women." In March 2015, on International Women's Day, the DNR held a propaganda beauty pageant featuring all female soldiers.

In their 2019 book Insurgent Women: Female Combatants in Civil Wars authors Darden, Henshaw and Szekely, while confirming the combat role of women in several Ukrainian and pro-Russian armed forces and militias as medics, drivers, sentries or on patrol, say that their participation in the first line of action, particularly as snipers, has been usually overstated by the media, or at least hard to verify. They distinguish female combatants by their motivation to become involved in the war. On the Ukrainian side, women were strongly moved by Ukrainian nationalism, while their pro-Russian counterpart fought for more personal reasons, like defending their families or homes. According to these authors, Ukrainian female soldiers actively chose "to go to the front. Those on the separatist side feel that the front came to them".

=== 2022 Russian invasion of Ukraine ===
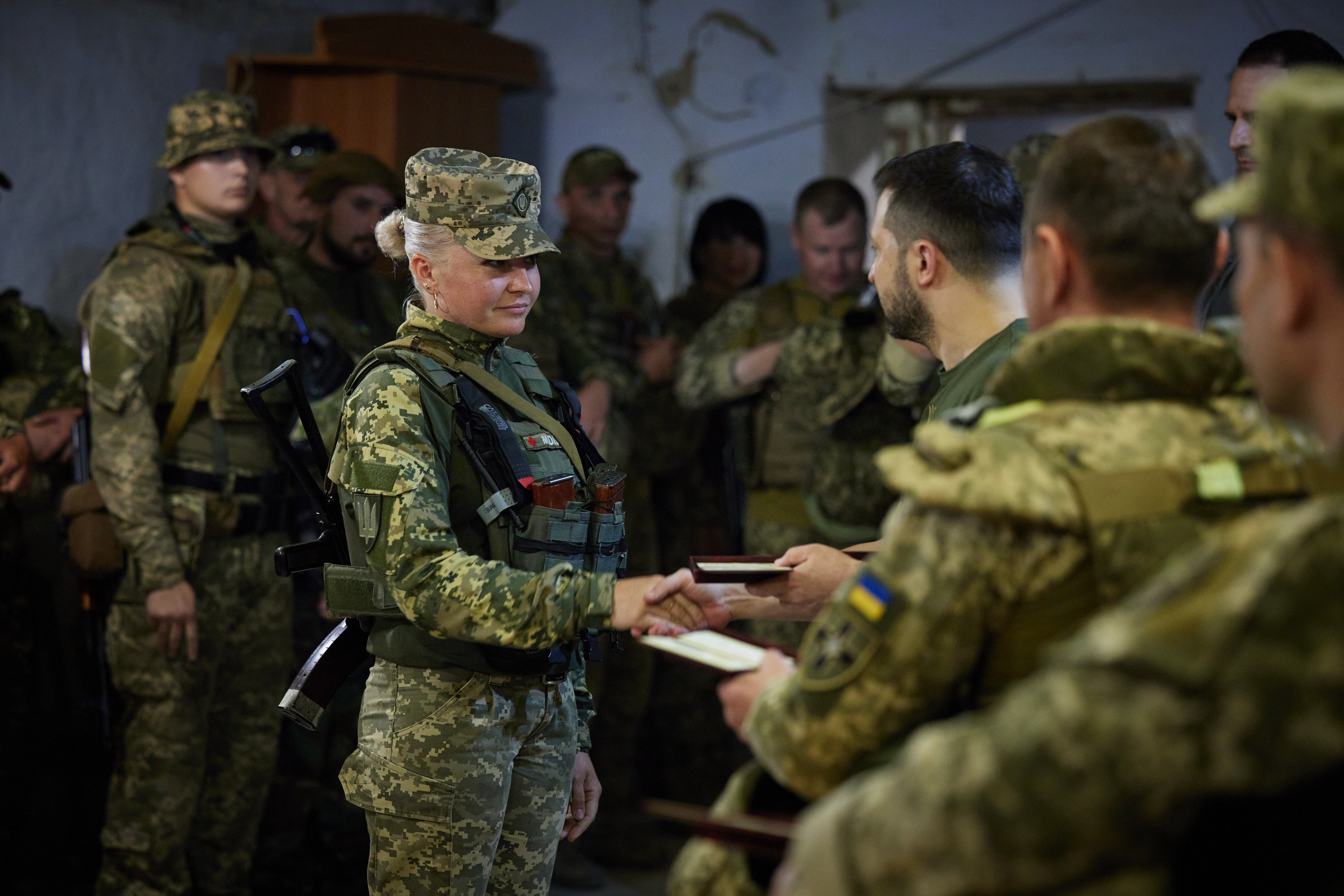
Zelenskyy on working trip to Mykolaiv and Odesa oblasts in June 2022

A significant number of women have volunteered to fight for the Ukrainian forces in response to the invasion. Mia Bloom and Sophia Moskalenko of Georgia State University have stated that "Ukrainian women have historically enjoyed independence not common in other parts of the globe" and that "Ukraine offers a unique insight into the roles that women can play in defending the nation and as leaders in their own right." In September 2022, Aljazeera stated: "There are about 50,000 women serving in the Ukrainian armed forces in combat and non-combat roles, of which about 10,000 are currently either on the front lines of the war or in jobs that could send them to the front lines, according to Ukrainian military officials. There were about 32,000 women in the military prior to the invasion."

In October 2022, the first all-female prisoner of war exchange occurred between Russia and Ukraine, with 108 Ukrainian women being returned, including 37 who had fought in the Battle of Azovstal.

=== Conscription ===
Under the looming threat from Russia, new legislation was enacted on 21 December 2021 requiring women to register for military service, if they are deemed medically fit for military service, are between the ages of 18 and 60, and work in specific professions. In the event of a major war, this expanded reserve of women would be mobilized as part of the national reserve to serve in a broad range of military specialties. According to earlier legislation, women in certain professions were already required to register for military conscription. However, the December 2021 revision of the law regulating Ukraine's military reserves dramatically expanded the number of professions that qualify for mandatory registration with the armed forces. Now women who are librarians, journalists, musicians, veterinarians, and psychologists, among many other professions, are required to register for military service. MP Oleksandra Ustinova stated: "...in [the] current situation, the decision to educate as many people as possible to hold arms and to be ready to serve seems a good one."

Following the 24 February 2022 invasion, the Ukrainian government enforced a mobilisation order on men aged between 18 and 60 to be available for conscription as combatants. In a representative national poll on 3–4 March 2022, 59% of Ukrainian women said they were 'ready to personally participate in the armed resistance to end the Russian occupation of Ukraine.' Though Ukraine's Ministry of Defence significantly expanded the pool of Ukrainian women who are required to register for military conscription into various non-combat roles, due to the initial influx of volunteers many have not been called up for conscription, and many female volunteers who were not required to register have been put on a waiting list. One woman who spoke to reporters said she had been told; "Ok, you will be in line. But now we have too many people". Many men and women who are not in the service of the military volunteer their time and work in supporting their communities in other ways. By mid-March 2022, additional Ukrainian women, after either leaving Ukraine as a refugee or living abroad, had also returned to the country to enlist in the armed forces, or provide support services, such as helping others evacuate. According to an April 2022 survey, 69% of women intended to help by providing non-military support (delivering food, information, or ammunition) to the Ukrainian army, 65% of women were thinking of caring for injured civilians and soldiers, and 27% of women had plans to join the Ukrainian forces in various combat roles. Conscription of women in general is not yet in place, however women with medical degrees are required to register for conscription

=== Notable individuals ===
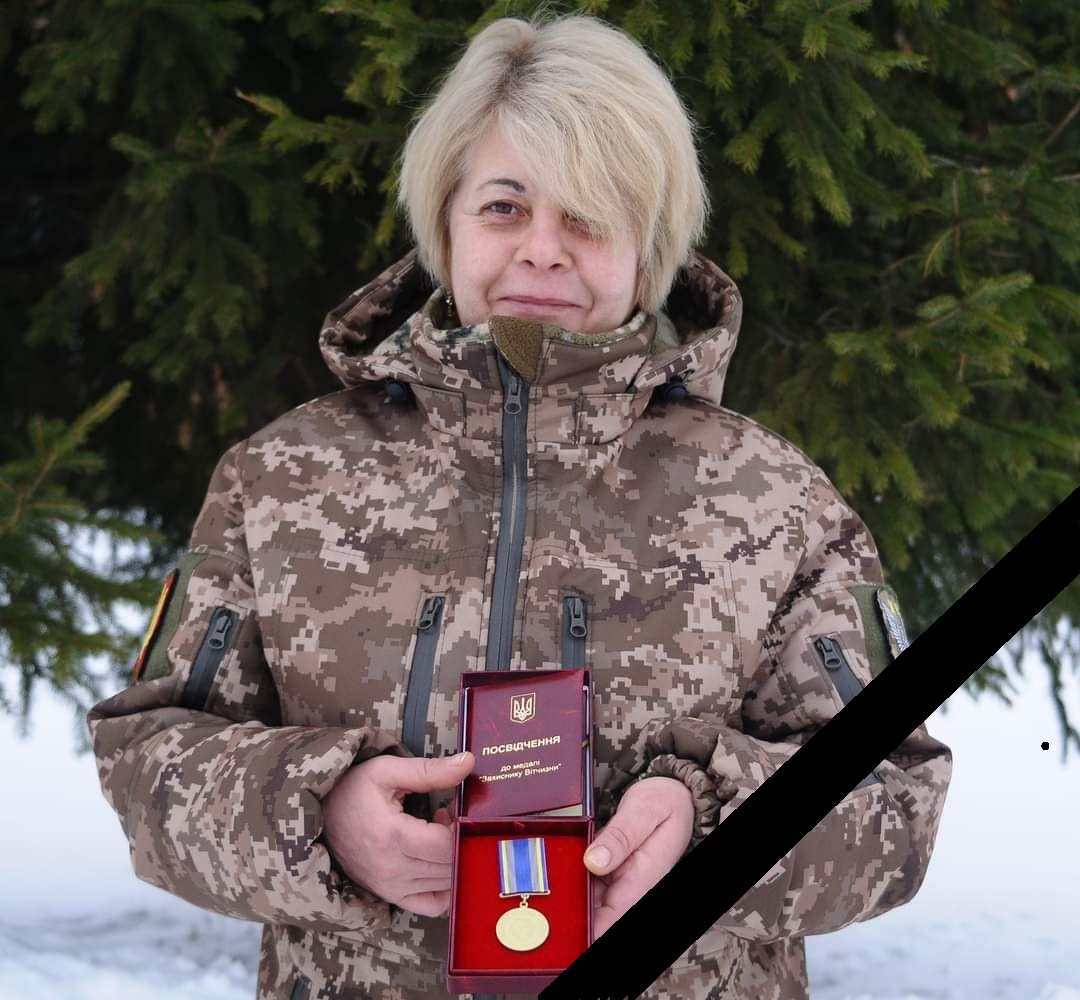
Inna Derusova with her Defender of the Motherland Medal in January 2022. She was killed in the opening days of the February 2022 invasion, becoming the first woman to be posthumously named a Hero of Ukraine.

In the opening days of the invasion, field medic Inna Derusova was said to have saved the lives of more than 10 soldiers during the Battle of Okhtyrka, before she was killed in a Russian artillery attack. On 12 March 2022, Derusova became the first woman to be posthumously awarded the highest national military title of Hero of Ukraine. During the invasion, Liubov Plaksiuk became the first woman to command an artillery division in the Ukrainian army. Tetyana Chubar, an artillery platoon commander, gained prominence on the internet after a video of her fighting during the Siege of Chernihiv went viral. Sarah Ashton-Cirillo is an American who initially worked as a journalist during the invasion before resigning to enlist as a combat medic in the Ukrainian military, later serving as a spokeswoman for the Territorial Defence Forces.

== Position ==
=== Combat and noncombat roles ===
"Until parliament passed a 2018 law, the military was patriarchal, and women were not legally allowed to serve in combat positions or study all disciplines at military universities. For example, [during the [War in Donbas], we had biathletes who were great snipers, but according to their documents, they were cooks. It was totally unfair.

— Oksana Hryhorieva (Gender Adviser to the General Staff of the Armed Forces of Ukraine)

Until the Verkhovna Rada passed a new law in 2018, women were officially barred from serving in combat roles within the military. Some still did so anyway, while officially serving in non-combat roles such as "cooks", without receiving the same benefits as their male comrades. The 2018 law allowed women to serve in all combat positions, and study all disciplines at military universities.

On 6 September 2018, the Verkhovna Rada of Ukraine eventually approved in the second reading, and in general with technical and legal amendments, the draft "Law of Ukraine "On Amendments to Some Laws of Ukraine on Ensuring Equal Rights and Opportunities for Women and Men during Military Service in the Armed Forces of Ukraine and Other Military Formations". This allowed women to acquire combat specialities at the legislative level. Since then, women have served in positions of their own choice. Currently, all restrictions on military specialities that women can have in the Armed Forces have been abolished.

=== Discrimination ===
Women in the Ukrainian military still face significant levels of discrimination and stigma, both formally, until 2019 still being barred from a number of positions, and with provisions like proper uniforms and maternity leave still lacking, and from their fellow soldiers. One female soldier recounted some of the discrimination she faced to Hromadske.TV in 2019: "I liberated 11 cities, I was involved in prisoner releases, but, nonetheless, most people would say that I am a “Carpathian, who fought in the first months of her pregnancy,” without taking my military experience into account." According to the Atlantic Council in 2020:

Women served in both the Ukrainian military and volunteer battalions. In the process, they experienced sexual harassment on the frontlines and faced sexual discrimination upon their return home. Many women soldiers were criticized for leaving their children and families to serve, stereotyped as sexually promiscuous, or even investigated by social services and had their children taken away. The discrimination is often so bad that women veterans will not wear uniforms. Women are encouraged to ignore their trauma. As one female volunteer put it, “Men go to the pubs with other men, but women must get back to their jobs and take care of their children.”

In 2019, the Invisible Battalion 2.0 report found that sexual harassment and sexual violence against female soldiers was still common, and rarely reported or investigated. As of May 2021, a working group was set up at the General Staff of the Armed Forces of Ukraine with the support of NGOs to form an internal mechanism for responding to sexual harassment. The relevant department of the Ministry of Defence developed a draft Law of Ukraine "On Amendments to Certain Legislative Acts of Ukraine on Regulation of Response, Prevention and Counteraction to Sex Discrimination and Sexual Harassment among Military Personnel". In July 2021, the relevant committee of the Verkhovna Rada recommended that Parliament adopt this bill aimed at combating sexual harassment in the army. In August 2023, a whistleblower told The Guardian that a commander in a combat unit had ordered female subordinates to have sex with him or face their husbands being sent to the front. Deputy Defence Minister Hanna Maliar responded by vowing to help pursue army commanders credibly accused of sexual harassment through the courts.

In July 2021, the Ukrainian military faced criticism after it announced that women soldiers would be marching in high heels in the parade marking 30 years of independence. The Ukrainian Ministry of Defence stated that the military's 2017 dress code included high heels.

=== Invisible Battalion ===
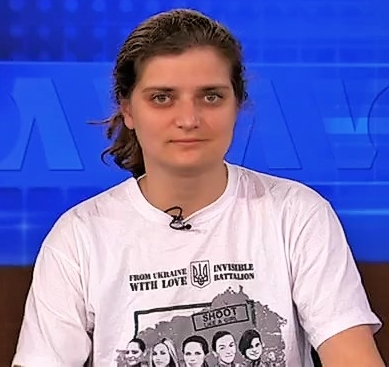
Maria Berlinska, aerial scout and co-founder of military women's rights project Invisible Battalion, interviewed by Voice of America in 2018

Invisible Battalion (Ukrainian: Невидимий Батальйон, romanized: Nevydymyy Batal'yon) is a Ukrainian advocacy campaign, a sociological research group, and a civil rights project for gender equality in the Armed Forces of Ukraine. As a result of the campaign, the pressure of society and different international organizations, the Ministry of Defence of Ukraine expanded the number of military jobs available to women to 63 with Directive #292, "On expanding military jobs for soldier, sergeant, and officer staff".

=== Provision of military uniforms and hygiene products ===
The provision of servicewomen in the Armed Forces of Ukraine with fitting women's military uniforms, women's underwear and hygiene products is generally not done by the government, but by several NGOs, including ArmWomenNow (Озброїмо жінок зараз), Землячки (Zemliachky, "Fellow Countrywomen"), and Швейна рота ("The Sewing Company"). Each of them emerged shortly after the full-scale Russian invasion of Ukraine began in February 2022 as social and volunteer initiatives aimed at providing female soldiers in the Ukrainian Armed Forces with military uniforms, underwear, balaclavas and shoes/boots fitting for women, and according to NATO standards (STANAG).

Although women at the front were initially provided with light plates for body armour, light helmets, comfortable shoes, gloves, specific medical drugs, backpacks, first-aid kits, underwear and a "female humanitarian" package consisting of 30 hygiene products, hundreds of female soldiers soon asked for a proper women's uniform. It was found out that the Ministry of Defence of Ukraine had approved only ceremony women's uniforms, while field uniforms were provided only for men. Due to the inconsistency of standard army patterns with the peculiarities of women's bodily constitution, servicewomen were forced to alter men's uniforms to their sizes at their own expense. Although several allied countries were able to provide Ukraine with apt women's uniforms (the British women's uniform 5.1 proved to be the best, and was the basis of many new Ukrainian experimental designs), others were not so suited for the circumstances, and still by far not in sufficient quantities. The three organisations gathered a lot of clothing and military specialists, conducted many field tests and improved their designs based on the soldiers' feedback and requests, while upscaling their production capacity in cooperation with the regular fashion industry to meet the growing demand.

Balaclavas designed for men were too large for women, and assumed the wearer to have short hair, while most women had long hair; therefore, smaller women's balaclaves were developed by The Sewing Company, with an opening for a ponytail or a braid. Similarly, ArmWomenNow began producing more army boots, as women generally have smaller feet than men, but most Ukrainian manufacturers do not make them at small sizes such as 35/36. By August 2023, proper women's uniforms had been tested by the NGOs and soldiers, and approved by the Ministry of Defence, which was negotiating with manufacturing companies on producing the designs at scale, and supplying them to the women fighting on the front.

=== Public perception ===
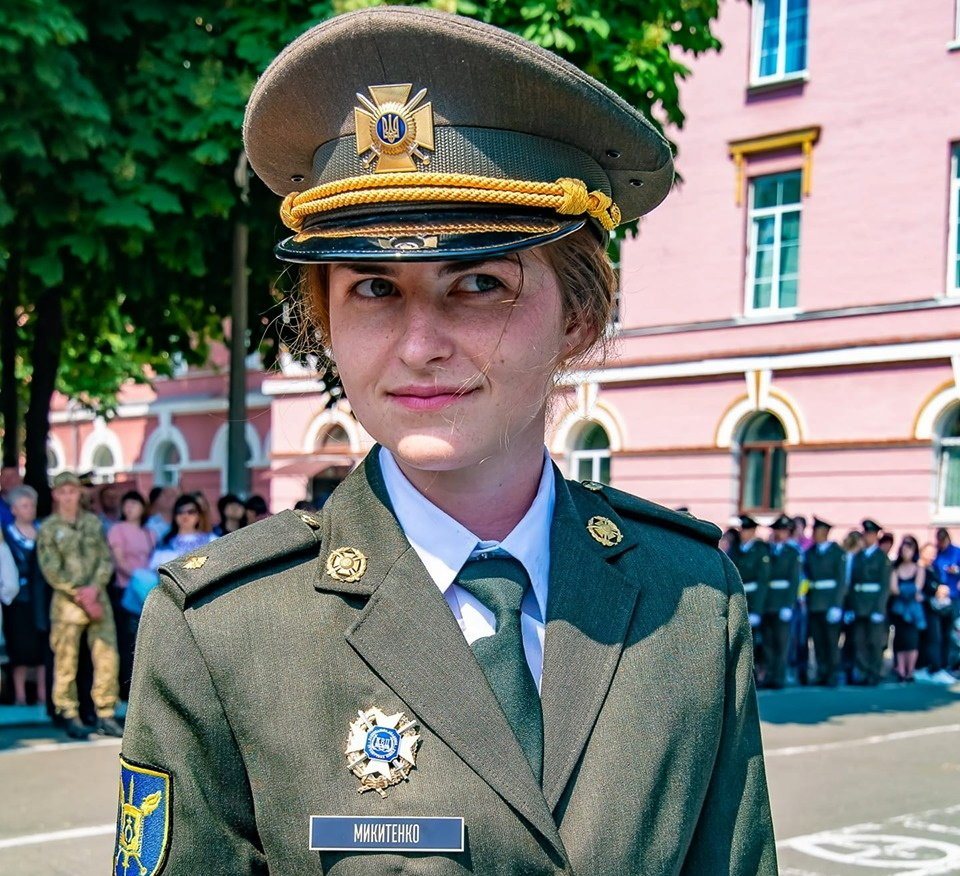
Lt. Yulia Mykytenko has fought in the Russo-Ukrainian War since 2016, receiving the Order for Courage (3rd class) in October 2022.

Studies have shown that the idea of equality between women and men in the army was supported by 53% of Ukrainians in 2018; by March 2023, this number had increased to 80% of Ukrainians. Nevertheless, deputy director Svitlana Chunikhina of the Institute of Social and Political Psychology of the National Academy of Educational Sciences of Ukraine noted that gender stereotypes in society were more difficult to correct than racial and ethnic prejudices.

According to a March 2023 study, 85% of Ukrainian citizens had a positive attitude towards women serving in the Armed Forces of Ukraine (ZSU). 81% of respondents believed that a woman can command a combat unit, just like a man. At the same time, 48% of respondents considered inequalities between women and men in the Armed Forces to be 'rare', and 51% believed that women in the Ukrainian army 'do not experience' discrimination.

During the All-Ukrainian Forum "Women's Leadership in Time of War" in July 2023, Deputy Minister of Defence of Ukraine Hanna Maliar stated: "I am proud of Ukrainian women in the Armed Forces. Ukrainian women are super strong, and we demonstrate this to the world. They do men's hard work with excessive loads. We have lifted all restrictions on the professions that women can master in the Armed Forces. Now women are tankers, artillerists, snipers, et cetera. And this is a powerful Ukrainian force."

== In popular culture ==
- Invisible Battalion (film), 2017 documentary film resulting from the Invisible Battalion project
- Women in War (2017) (W in W), 2017 documentary film about women in the war in eastern Ukraine
- No Obvious Signs, 2018 documentary film about war trauma amongst Ukrainian female soldiers
- The Earth Is Blue as an Orange, 2020 Ukrainian documentary film about the war in Donbas
- The song "Stefania" by Kalush Orchestra, the winner of the Eurovision Song Contest 2022, featured women in Ukrainian military uniforms in its music video, with frontman Oleh Psiuk saying that the song had acquired new meanings after the Russian invasion "because a lot of people are perceiving it as if Ukraine is my mother."

== See also ==
- Women drone operators in the Ukrainian military
- Women in Ukraine

== Bibliography ==
- Martsenyuk, Tamara (July 2022). "Women's Participation in Defending Ukraine in Russia's War" (PDF). Global Cooperation Research – A Quarterly Magazine. University of Duisburg-Essen: 5.
- Rusnak, Ivan (2021). "White Book 2019-2020; The Armed Forces of Ukraine and The State Special Transport Service" (PDF). White Book Information Bulletin: 97 – via Ministry of Defence of Ukraine.
