= Olga Plakhotnik =

Ukrainian feminist

Olga Plakhotnik (sometimes Olha Plakhotnik) a Canada-based Ukrainian social philosopher, editor, writer, and academic focused on feminism and queer studies.

She is noted for her analysis of feminism at the Euromaidan protests and for her publication Radical "Femen" and new women's activism. Plakhotnik is a co-editor in chief of Feminist Critique: East European Journal of Feminist and Queer Studies.

== Career ==
Plakhotnik is a post-doctoral researcher at the University of Alberta where she focusses on feminism and queer studies. In 2012, she was awarded a Fulbright scholarship.

She is a co-editor in chief of Feminist Critique: East European Journal of Feminist and Queer Studies.

== Publications ==
- Postsovetskii feminizm: ukrainskii variant, Gendernye issledovaniia, 17(2008):193
- Olga Plakhotnik and Maria Mayerchyk, Ukrainian Feminism at the Crossroad of National, Postcolonial, and (Post)Soviet: Theorizing the Maidan Events 2013–2014,” Krytyka (November 2015)
- Olga Plakhotnik and Maria Mayerchyk, Radykalnyi Femen i novyi zhinochyi aktyvizm, (English: Radical "Femen" and new women's activism) Krytyka 11 (December 2010): 7–10
- Book chapter “Safety” Under the Question: Contesting Competences and Affects in a Feminist Classroom in Theories of Affect and Concepts in Generic Skills Education: Adventurous Encounters, edited by Edyta Just and Wera Grahn, Cambridge Scholars Publishing
- Chapter in Gender, Politics, and Society in Ukraine by: Frear, Matthew, Europe-Asia Studies, 09668136, Jan2014, Vol. 66, Issue 1

== Personal life ==
Plakhotnik lives in Edmonton, Alberta, Canada.

== See also ==
=== Relevant topics ===
- Femen
- Women in Ukraine

=== Ukrainian feminist scholars ===
- Vira Ageyeva
- Tamara Martsenyuk
- Irina Zherebkina
