= Maria Mayerchyk =

Ukrainian feminist academic

Maria Mayerchyk (Ukrainian: Маєрчик Марія Степанівна, born 15 October 1971) is a Ukrainian feminist academic and the editor-in-chief of Feminist Critique: East European Journal of Feminist and Queer Studies.

They are noted for their analysis of feminism at the Euromaidan protests.

== Education ==
Mayerchyk attended the Ivan Franko National University of Lviv, from 1988 to 1993, from where they have a degree in journalism.

They have a PhD from the National Academy of Sciences of Ukraine that focused on ethnology.

== Career ==
Mayerchyk have been a fellow in research programs at the University of Greifswald (Germany), University of Alberta (Canada), Harvard University (USA), the University of South Florida (USA), Lund University (Sweden), Central European University (Hungary), and the Centre for Advanced Studies Sofia (Bulgaria).

They are a senior research scholar at the National Academy of Sciences of Ukraine's Institute of Ethnology in Lviv. Their academic interests include diaspora, feminism, folklore, sexuality, queer studies, and decolonial epistemologies of the European periphery.

Mayerchyk are the editor-in-chief of Feminist Critique: East European Journal of Feminist and Queer Studies.

They were the academic director of the OSI-HESP ReSET project "Gender, Sexuality, and Power" (2011–2014).

== Publications ==
- Maria Mayerchyk, Olga Plakhotnik. “‘Uneventful’ Feminist Protest in Post-Maidan Ukraine: Nation and Coloniality Revisited.” Postcolonial and Postsocialist Dialogues: Intersections, Opacities, Challenges in Feminist Theorizing and Practice, ed. by R. Koobak, M. Tlostanova, and S. Thapar-Björkert, 121–137. New York: Routledge (Advances in Feminist Studies and Intersectionality Series), 2021. DOI: https://doi.org/10.4324/9781003003199-11
- Maria Mayerchyk and Olga Plakhotnik. “Between Time of Nation and Feminist Time: Genealogies of Feminist Protest in Ukraine.” Feminist Circulations between East and West / Feministische Zirkulationen zwischen Ost und West, ed. by Annette Bühler-Dietrich, 25–46. Berlin: Frank & Timme, 2019.
- Maria Mayerchyk and Olga Plakhotnik, Radykalnyi Femen i novyi zhinochyi aktyvizm, (English: Radical "Femen" and new women's activism) Krytyka 11 (December 2010): 7–10
- Maria Mayerchyk and Olga Plakhotnik, Ukrainian Feminism at the Crossroad of National, Postcolonial, and (Post)Soviet: Theorizing the Maidan Events 2013–2014,” Krytyka (November 2015)
- Структурно-семантичний аналіз українських обрядів родинного циклу (English: Ritual and Body. The structural-semantic analysis of the Ukrainian familial-cycle rites) 2011
- Mayerchyk, Maria. "Doshliubni intymmni stosunky sered molodi v selakh ta mistakh Skhidnoi ta Tsentral'noi Ukrainy na pochatku XX Stolittia," Україна Модерна, 6 (2010): 101–112

== See also ==
=== Relevant topics ===
- Femen
- Women in Ukraine

=== Ukrainian feminist scholars ===
- Vira Ageyeva
- Tamara Martsenyuk
- Irina Zherebkina
