= Women drone operators in the Ukrainian military =

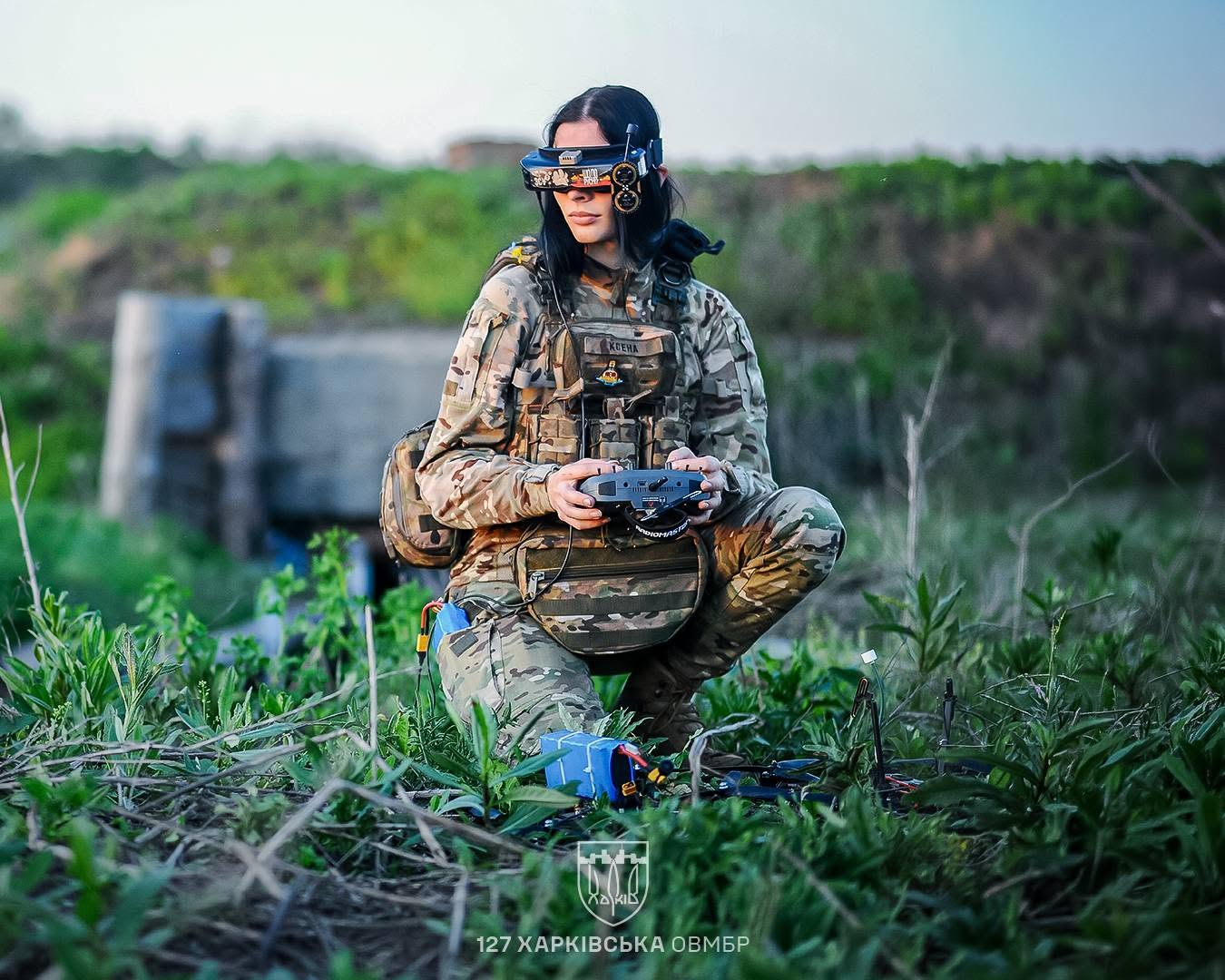
"Ksena", an FPV drone operator in the Kharkiv-based 127th Heavy Mechanized Brigade (c. June 2026)

Since the 2022 Russian invasion of Ukraine, women in the Ukrainian military (Note: Military or "Defence Forces of Ukraine" in the broadest sense. Not all strike drone units of Ukraine are part of the Unmanned Systems Forces (USF) (a branch of the Armed Forces of Ukraine, ZSU), which in April 2026 accounted for c. 31.15% of all Russian personnel losses inflicted by Ukrainian drone operations. Other Ukrainian military and security organisations employing strike (and reconnaissance) drones include (but are not limited to) the National Guard of Ukraine (such as units within the 13th Khartiia Brigade and 1st Azov Corps), the Security Service of Ukraine (SBU, known for Operation Spiderweb), the Defence Intelligency of Ukraine (HUR), and the State Border Guard Service of Ukraine, while USVs such as the Sea Baby are operated by the Ukrainian Navy in coordination with the HUR and SBU.) have increasingly served as drone operators and in drone-supporting functions, a role previously almost exclusively taken by men. As women in Ukraine are not subject to the 2022 Ukrainian mobilisation, (Note: As of 2026, mobilisation in Ukraine only applies to men of military age who are medically fit to serve and do not serve other important functions in Ukraine's war-time economy. The military reforms announced by the Ministry of Defence of Ukraine on 12 June 2026 does foresee a gradual transformation from a conscript-based to a contract-based force, with certain combat roles replaced by voluntary Ukrainian citizens, foreign citizens, or unmanned systems such as ground robots. But as long as there is a personnel shortage on the front lines, the Ministry deems it impossible to discharge certain mobilised men from military duty, depending on circumstances.) they join on a voluntary basis, primarily motivated by a sense of duty to their country and their fellow Ukrainians. (Note: '"Russia has come to our land and is killing us. What more motivation do you need?" Zoits, a drone operator, speaks with the calm precision of someone who has destroyed a Russian tank, standing tall despite her petite frame. Once civilians with careers in sports, marketing, and sales, more Ukrainian women are now picking up military uniforms as Russia's full-scale invasion rages on into its fourth year.') (Note: Yuliia: "I had no fear. What could be more frightening than realizing that while Russians are killing and torturing Ukrainians, I am resting at home?")

== Statistics ==
By early 2024, 70,000 women (8%) served in Ukraine's military (a 20% increase since 2022, and a 40% increase since 2021), about 5,500 of those in combat roles. In June 2024, then–Deputy Minister of Defence Natalia Kalmykova (since September 2024 Minister for Veterans Affairs) said that women were increasingly choosing professions in the military that, traditionally speaking, had not been considered feminine, such as shooting, controlling artillery systems, and operating drones. When the Drone Force Recruitment and Training Centre of the Unmanned Systems Forces of Ukraine (USF) (a branch of the Armed Forces of Ukraine) was established in May 2024, c. 10–11% of new entrants were women. As of December 2025, women accounted for 4.2% of all current personnel in the USF. By May 2026, 20% of new Drone Force recruits were women, with one intake in autumn 2025 seeing as many as 40% female recruits.

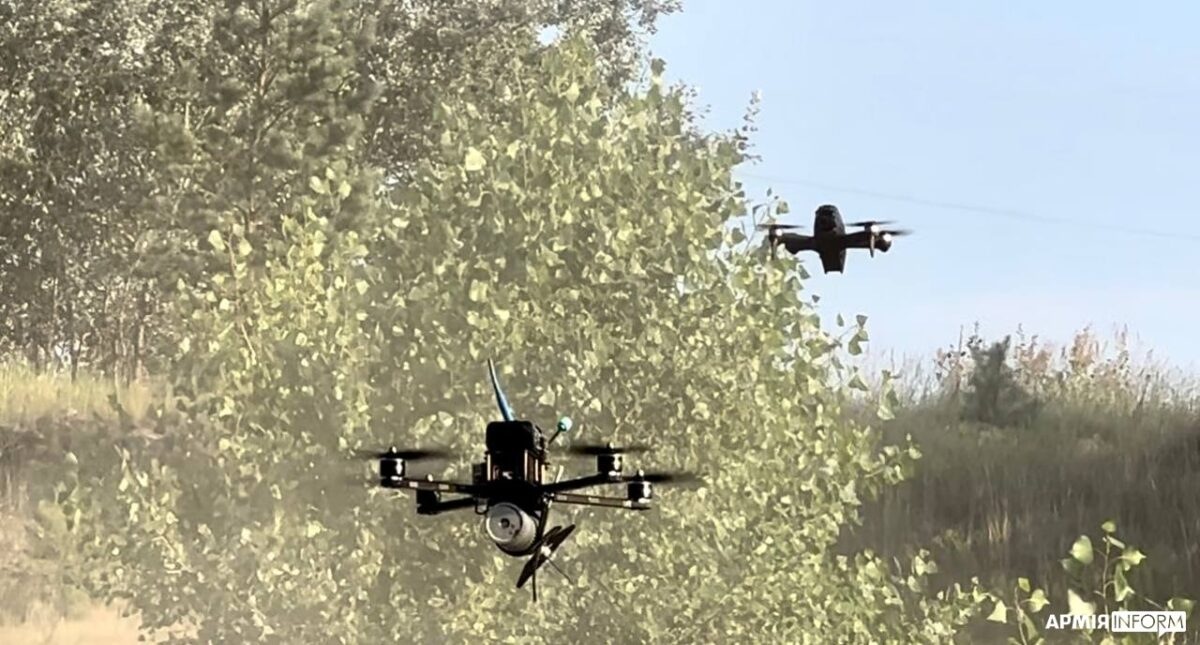
Ukrainian FPV drones (July 2023)

There are no precise figures of how many women serve as drone operators in Ukraine; estimates suggest thousands of women have been deployed as drone pilots and front-line technicians by December 2025. By that time, drone pilot had become one of the most popular combat professions for female recruits. Most Ukrainian women serve in mixed-gender drone combat crews, sometimes as leaders. In November 2025, the National Guard of Ukraine deployed its first all-female FPV drone combat crew, (Note: Ukrainian: бойовий екіпаж, romanized: bojovyj ekipazh.) as part of the larger Pilotless Systems Detachment "Typhoon". (Note: Ukrainian: загін безпілотних систем «Тайфун», romanized: zahin bezpilotnykh system "Tajfun".) By February 2026, the all-women "Harpies" strike unit was established within the 9th Unmanned Systems Brigade of the USF, receiving customised Vampire bomber drones developed specifically for women operators.

== Position ==
=== Combat and noncombat roles ===
Until the Verkhovna Rada passed a new law in 2018, women were officially barred from serving in combat roles within the military. Some still did so anyway, while officially serving in non-combat roles such as "cooks", without receiving the same benefits as their male comrades. The 2018 law allowed women to serve in all combat positions, and study all disciplines at military universities.

=== Motivation ===
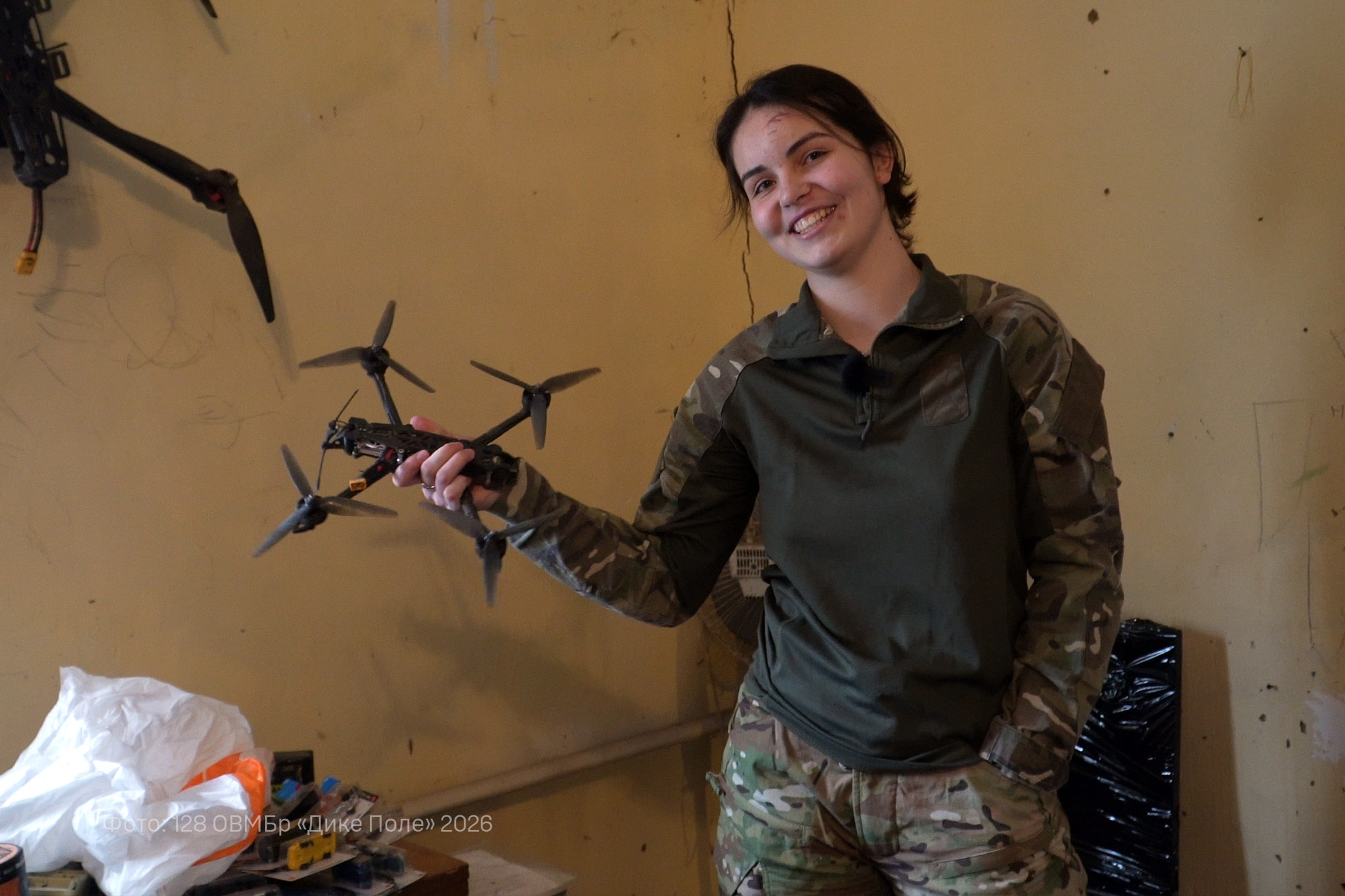
Miroslava, a drone operator with the Dnipro-based 128th Heavy Mechanized Brigade "Wild Fields"

Explaining their motives for serving as drone operators, women have primarily focussed on their sense of duty to their country and their fellow Ukrainians. Other motives include: to help address personnel shortages, (Note: Ilona (24): "So many men my age are already gone. Someone has to take their place.") (Note: '[Dasha] spent the first months of the invasion helping as a volunteer, then moved into drone work as more men from her region were killed or mobilised. "It wasn't about whether I was ready," she says. "It was about the fact that there were fewer people left."') (Note: '[Elisabeth's] FPV training coincided with a period of heavy losses in her region, and several members of her team were injured within months of deployment. The dynamic inside the units shifted quickly. "People stopped caring who was a woman or who wasn't," she says. "They cared who could fly."') to lend their technical, coordination or logistical expertise to the war effort, (Note: "If I know that I can be useful in planning or administrative work, then why not?" Kep asks. "There's no stigma about being a woman and working in administration. Logistics is tough work… Try to understand that if you can.") to liberate their hometown from occupying Russian forces, to provide a safe Ukraine for their children, or children they intended to have in the future, or to avenge loved ones lost to the invading Russian army. Some felt like they needed to do their part in the emancipation of women within the Armed Forces of Ukraine (ZSU) and Ukrainian society in general by demonstrating their skills and expertise in defence of the homeland. (Note: Dariia: "But through our work we try to show that we are not worse, maybe not better than others, but at the very least on the same level as men.") (Note: Dignitas Foundation: "[Female drone operators] break old ideas about who belongs on the battlefield.") Others expressly felt no need to prove what they already knew they were capable of, and that they were only there to defend the country. (Note: 'They were not there to prove women could fight like men. They already knew they could. They were there to defend their country. "I hate when people say I'm here serving instead of any male," Viktoriia said. "I didn't do it instead of a male — I did it for myself … and for my future family."') (Note: Dasha: "This isn't about women proving anything. It's about necessity. Everyone is stretched. Everyone is adapting.") (Note: Monka: "We need everyone — engineers, pilots, IT specialists, programmers. We simply need brains. It's not about men or women. We need people who are ready to work hard.")

A few women have said they were already good at playing video games, or software engineering, and that developing, operating and maintaining drones required similar skills. Others had no prior drone expertise, but found that the situation necessitated acquiring those skills in training before entering the war in their desired role as drone operators. Some women were living and working outside Ukraine when the full-scale invasion began in February 2022, and returned to Ukraine specifically to join the Defence Forces as drone operators or UAV/UGV tech supporters.

The fact that drone warfare imposes comparatively less severe physical demands on soldiers than in such male-dominated professions as (assault) infantry has been suggested as one reason why gender isn't much of an obstacle for women to enlist, nor a cause for prejudice for the men they serve with. Some women expressed that while drone piloting was still a life-threatening role, (Note: 'More women are moving into drone operation, repair, and electronic warfare as unmanned systems dominate the battlefield. ... Olha Meloshyna, spokesperson for Ukraine's Unmanned Systems Forces, said drone roles are not safer. Russian forces actively hunt operators.') with many having lost fellow drone operators – men and women – in the line of duty, it was one they felt far better suited to fill than as frontline infantry in trench warfare. On the other hand, it was perceived as more active in fighting the enemy than roles such as combat paramedic, or volunteer in fundraising, training workshops, first-aid courses or other support positions at the home front. A couple of women indicated they found their military career and life far more exciting and meaningful than a civilian job, particularly in times of war.

=== Representation ===
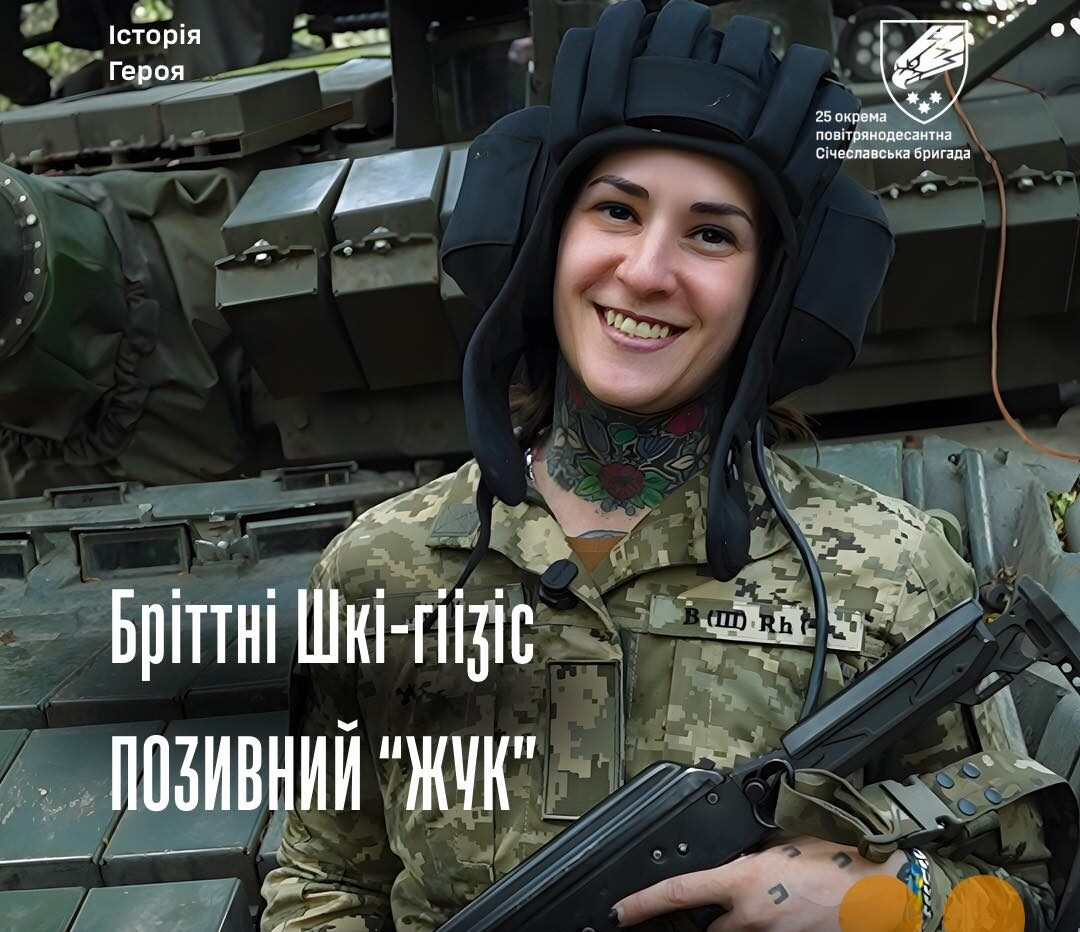
Drone operator Brittney "Beetle", former Canadian tank captain, using FPV drones in the UAV platoon of the 25th Airborne Brigade "Sicheslav"'s tank battalion.

Women's overall and leadership representation tends to be higher in drone units than in other branches of the military (or the Security Service of Ukraine (SBU), the Main Directorate of Intelligence of Ukraine, the border guards, and other organisations that deploy drone units). Nevertheless, they occasionally face similar issues of prejudice despite it not being a norm, such as discrimination, (Note: '[Yuliia] said sexism exists, but it is not the norm. "It depends on individual people," she said. "The most important thing is not to be afraid to stand up for yourself.") harassment, and a glass ceiling for certain leadership roles as in other branches. Sapfira, Deputy Battalion Commander of the 13th Khartiia Brigade, which has been actively looking for women to serve as drone operators, said in July 2025: "At first, everyone was curious about how a woman would lead in such a position. Over time, they got used to it and listened, but sometimes I still had to raise my voice." Leila Abdullayeva ("Saratsyn") of the 20th Unmanned Systems Brigade "K-2" became the first woman to serve as acting Battalion Commander, leading over 100 soldiers she interviewed and selected herself. In February 2026, President of Ukraine Volodymyr Zelenskyy awarded her with the Order of Bohdan Khmelnytsky, Third Class, which she interpreted "as a collective award rather than a personal one", adding: "At that time, our unit accounted for around 80% of the enemy losses attributed to the regiment."

Yaryna Chornohuz, who has been serving in the war for six years, first as combat medic, then a strike drone operator, wrote in March 2026: "It is gratifying to see how attitudes toward women in the military have shifted during these years of full-scale war. Many of my sisters-in-arms ... have risen to command positions and senior ranks, and some lead the first all-female drone units." "A woman in military uniform is a powerful symbol – but not everyone is prepared to see us as subjects, especially within the military ... Many commanders, even of the newer generation, prefer to see women in uniform as symbols: static, exceptional, and – as a consequence – immobilized in their professional development within the army. A symbol is displayed and used for inspiration. A subject is trusted, given responsibility, allowed to choose, and to grow." "Many of my sisters-in-arms, now veterans, have fought their way into combat positions and direct participation in combat operations — including as infantry soldiers and assault troops — have risen to command positions and senior ranks, and some lead the first all-female drone units."

=== Recruitment ===
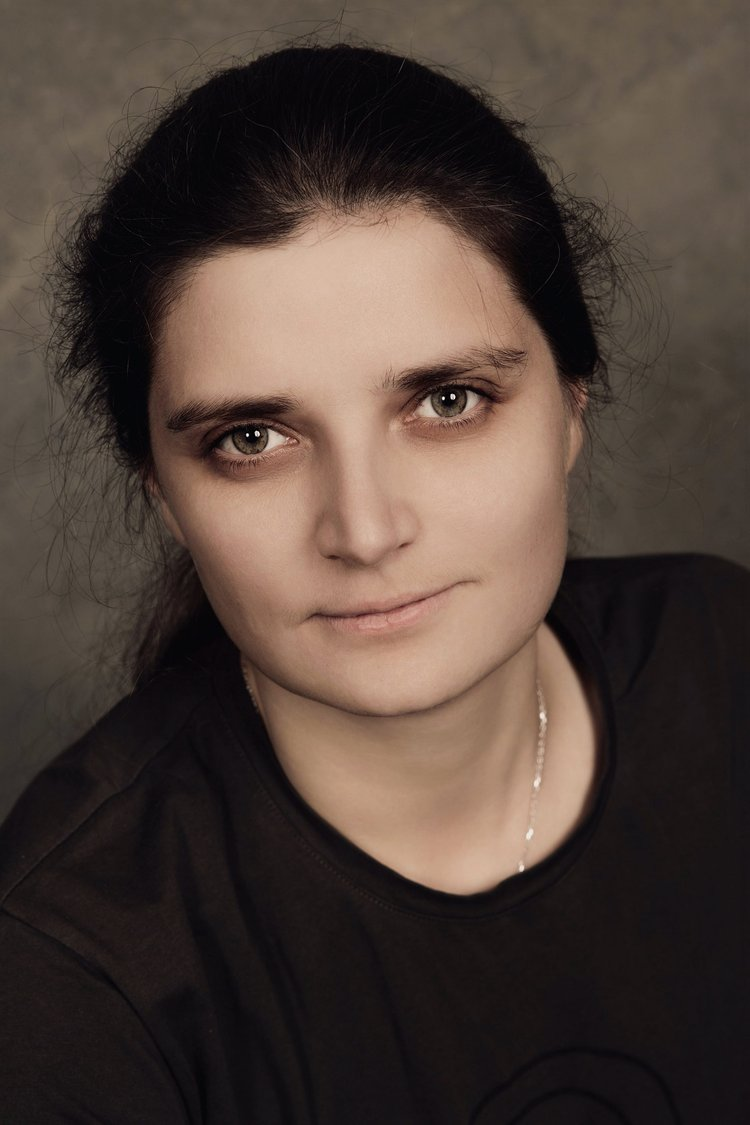
Victory Drones founder Maria Berlinska in 2024

Recruitment centres and drone units and formations have therefore increasingly focussed on recruiting women for piloting drones. Some advertising campaigns of brigades of the National Guard, such as the Azov Brigade and the 13th Khartiia Brigade, deliberately feature women as serving in combat roles, for example as ground or aerial drone operators, electronic warfare, ISTAR and cybersecurity specialists. Recruitment officer Andriy Ostapenko said: "This is not an isolated case, but a systemic component of our units. Female servicemembers from the first days have proven quite effective in various positions, proving their effectiveness as UAV operators or UGV operators, engineers, analysts and unit commanders."

Lyubov Shypovych, co-founder of charitable foundation Dignitas, said that gender does not matter in the new type of war now being waged in Ukraine: "A woman can just as well be an EW operator, a drone operator, an analyst, a communications and radio-electronic reconnaissance specialist." Former aerial reconnaissance operator Maria Berlinska, another co-founder of Dignitas, as well as Victory Drones, has been called "one of Ukraine's leading voices on military modernization and women's integration into the Ukrainian army". By April 2026, Berlinksa's Victory Drones project had reportedly helped train over 50,000 military personnel in pilotless systems, as well as remove legal customs barriers to allow easier import of foreign-produced drones into Ukraine.

USF spokesperson Olha Meloshyna explained that the branch was aiming to recruit 15,000 more men and women: "We are part of the new Ukrainian army that formed during the invasion. So in terms of gender-based acceptance into the armed forces, we have never had any division. What matters to us is desire and motivation." She added that enlisting women applied both for combat and noncombat positions. Tank platoon commander "Masalyot" argued that gender has no significance for UAV work: "A woman can fly any drone – reconnaissance or strike. The main thing is desire. This is 90% of success. And they show initiative first."

Since a law was passed allowing the mobilisation of convicted individuals in May 2024, a very strict selection of female prisoners has, after thorough screening, also been given the opportunity of redeeming themselves by fighting in defence of the country. In June 2026, University of Notre Dame professor Michael C. Desch of International Relations pointed out that the available pool of women in Ukrainian prisons was only about 1,500, of which just over 200 made it through the screening to become soldiers since May 2024; the contribution of this women prisoner redemption option to the easing of Ukraine's personnel shortage was therefore, according to Desch, rather small and the measure a "feel-good story". On the other hand, the female prisoners-turned-soldiers themselves, often serving in the drone forces, have shown high levels of motivation and gratitude for the second chance society has given them, and Brigade Commander Mykola from the Shkval Battalion praised their determinacy and qualitative combat performance.

== See also ==
- Women in the Ukrainian military
- Middle strike campaign
- Invisible Battalion
- Unmanned Systems Forces of Ukraine (USF)
