= Yulia Mykytenko =

Ukrainian soldier (born 1995)

- Юлія Микитенко
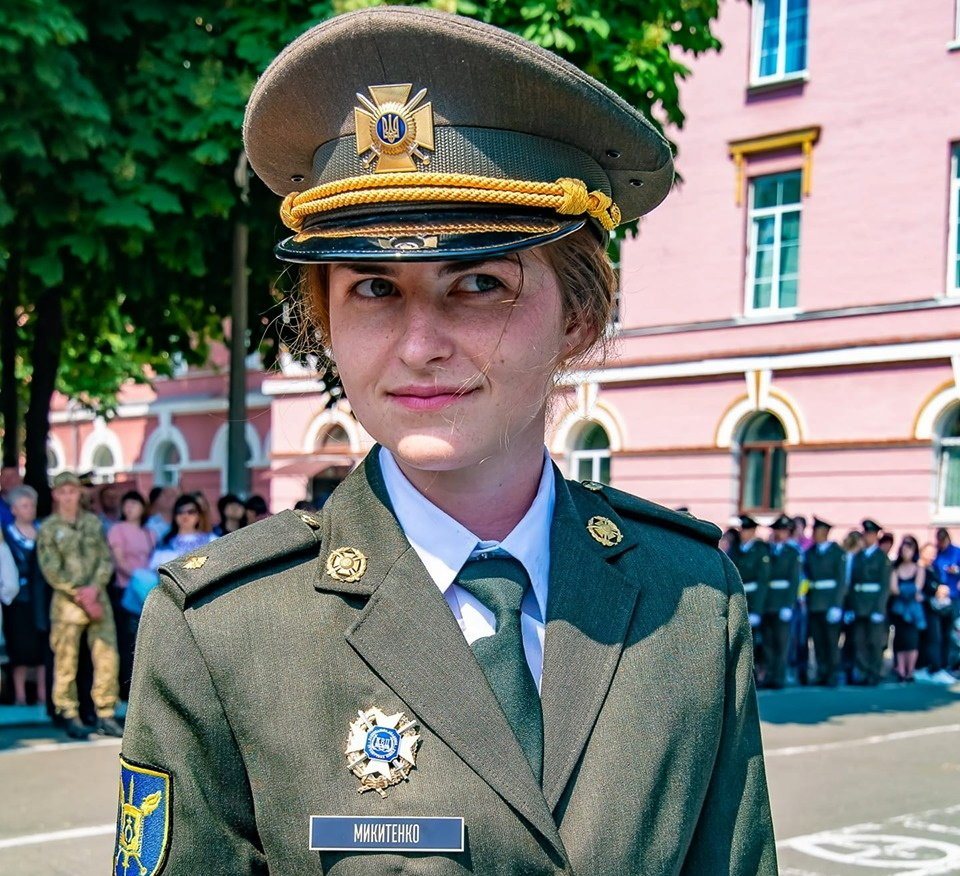
- Born: July 18, 1995 (age 31); Kyiv, Ukraine
- Alma mater: National University of Kyiv-Mohyla Academy (2012-2016); Hetman Petro Sahaidachnyi National Ground Forces Academy (2017)
- Military career
- Allegiance: Ukraine
- Branch: Ukrainian Ground Forces
- Service years: 2016-2021 and since 2022
- Rank: Senior lieutenant
- Nickname: "Symirochka" (Ukrainian: "Симірочка")
- Units: 54th Mechanized Brigade (2016-2018; since 2022); Ivan Bohun Military High School (2018-2021)
- Conflicts: Battle of Svitlodarsk
- Awards: Order of Bohdan Khmelnytsky (3rd class); Order for Courage (3rd class)

Yulia Mykolaivna Mykytenko (Ukrainian: Юлія Миколаївна Микитенко, born 18 July 1995) is a military servicewoman of the Armed Forces of Ukraine, combatant of the Russo-Ukrainian War, recipient of the Order of Bohdan Khmelnytsky (3rd class) and the Order for Courage (3rd class), activist of the сivic movement "Vidsich" and of the NGO "Female veterans movement".

== Biography ==
=== Early years ===
Mykytenko was born on 18 July 1995 in Kyiv. Her parents met while working at a currency exchange point; her mother was a cashier and her father was a security guard. As a child, Julia dreamed of becoming a simultaneous translator. In 2012, she entered the National University of Kyiv-Mohyla Academy and graduated in 2016 with a degree in philology.

During the Euromaidan she was in the "Female Squad" of the 16th regiment of the Euromaidan Self-defence Force. Together with other Kyiv-Mohyla Academy students she participated in demonstrations near numerous universities all over Kyiv, calling on students to join the protests. Right after Euromaidan she took part in the activities of the сivic movement "Vidsich" (particularly, in the campaign "Do not buy Russian goods!"). She also did some open-source intelligence for the Ukrainian military: she searched and collected information about Russian military in Twitter. Meanwhile, her father volunteered for the National Guard of Ukraine in February 2014.

=== 54th Mechanized Brigade ===
In March 2015 she met with military serviceman Ilia Serbin of the 54th Mechanized Brigade, when her father (with whom she was living at the moment) was asked to let Serbin stay overnight at his home. Three month later they were married. The couple decided to join the 54th Mechanized Brigade together, right after Mykytenko graduated from the university. At that time, the brigade was fighting near Svitlodar, some of the heaviest fighting of the Ukrainian frontline. They did exactly that on 17 July 2016 (beforehand, Ilia had already served in the brigade as a mobilized person).

After two months of service at the headquarters, Ilia was assigned to a combat position - a scout. Yulia was appointed to a clerk position at the headquarters, since at that time women were not allowed to hold combat positions. Yulia worked as a clerk and then as an accountant for about a year. In the spring of 2017, as a person with a higher education, she was sent to a three-month officer course at the Hetman Petro Sahaidachnyi National Ground Forces Academy in Lviv. Upon her return, she was appointed to a position of commander of a motorized infantry platoon, and later a commander of a reconnaissance platoon (her experience in data collection and analytics contributed to this). However, according to Yulia, she encountered a lot of sexism and skepticism about that "a woman can fight". It even got to the point that some soldiers refused to fight under the command of a woman and were transferred to other units. She had to make considerable efforts to gain respect and obedience from her subordinates.

=== Ivan Bohun Military High School ===
On 22 February 2018 her husband died as a result of mortar shelling near the town of Luhanske. Yulia decided to transfer to a teacher position at the Ivan Bohun Military High School. The very same year, girls were allowed to enter the school for the very first time, and Yulia was appointed a commander of a very first female platoon of twenty girls. According to Yulia, she took this job very seriously, because the success of this experimental female class was crucial for whether the girls would continue to be accepted to the school and for how successful the reforms will be to increase the number and improve conditions for women in the Armed Forces of Ukraine. In addition to the usual duties of a class curator, Yulia also had to deal with the everyday problems of her subordinates, since the school, like the Armed Forces of Ukraine in general, was not completely adapted for the education and accommodation of girls.

At night of 11 October 2020 her father, Mykola Mykytenko, also a veteran of the Donbas war, set himself on fire at the Independence Square in Kyiv to show his protest against the policies of Volodymyr Zelenskyy administration, which he considered to be leading the country into capitulation. Three days later, on 14 October, he died of his burns. Thus, because of the war, she lost both her husband and her father.

=== Russian full-scale invasion ===
On 2 September 2021 she left the Armed Forces of Ukraine, planning to build her career somewhere in the civilian sphere. After leaving the army, she worked as a project manager in the human rights public project "Invisible Battalion" and in several other projects for the reintegration of war veterans into society, for example in the "Veteranius" initiative.

She was mobilized back to the Armed Forces of Ukraine on 24 February 2022, when the Russian full-scale invasion into Ukraine began. For the first few months, she served in a unit located in Kyiv, and after the liberation of the north of Ukraine, she returned to the 54th Mechanized Brigade (where she served back then, during the Donbas war), which was fighting in the Donetsk Oblast. On 14 October 2022 by decree of the President of Ukraine she was awarded the Order for Courage (3rd class), and on 13 May 2024 she was awarded the Order of Bohdan Khmelnytsky (3rd class).

== Gallery ==
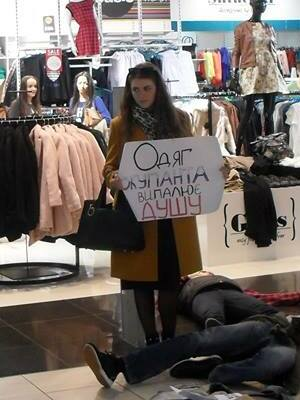
Yulia Mykytenko takes part in a demonstration within the "Do not buy Russian goods!" campaign, September 2014.

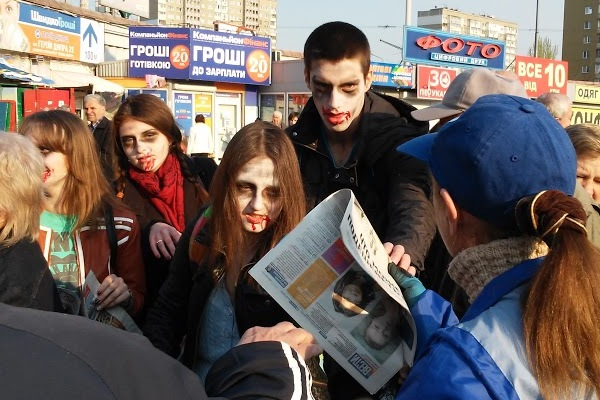
Yulia Mykytenko takes part in a theatralized "zombie-demonstration" against the "Vesti newspaper", which was thought by activists to be engaged in anti-Ukrainian propaganda, April 2015 (second from the left, in a red scarf).

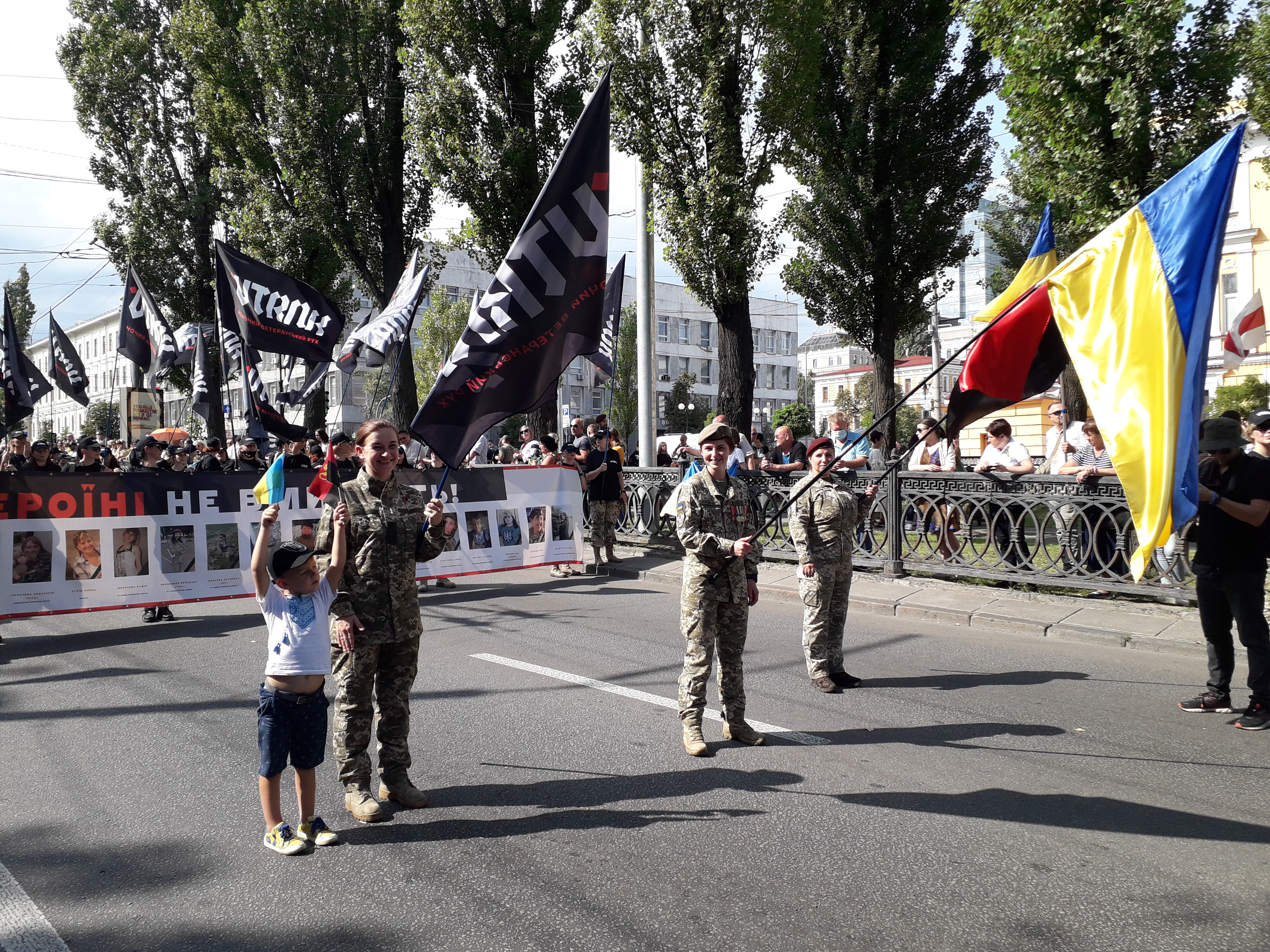
Yulia Mykytenko leads the "Female veterans movement" column at the unofficial ("volunteer") military parade for the Independence Day of Ukraine on August 24, 2021 (in the middle).

== See also ==
- Invisible Battalion
- 54th Mechanized Brigade (Ukraine)
- Ivan Bohun Military High School
- Women in the military
- Vidsich

== Links ==
- Yulia Mykytenko on Facebook
- Yulia Mykytenko on Instagram
