= Hanna Maliar =

Former Ukrainian deputy minister of defense

Hanna Vasylivna Maliar
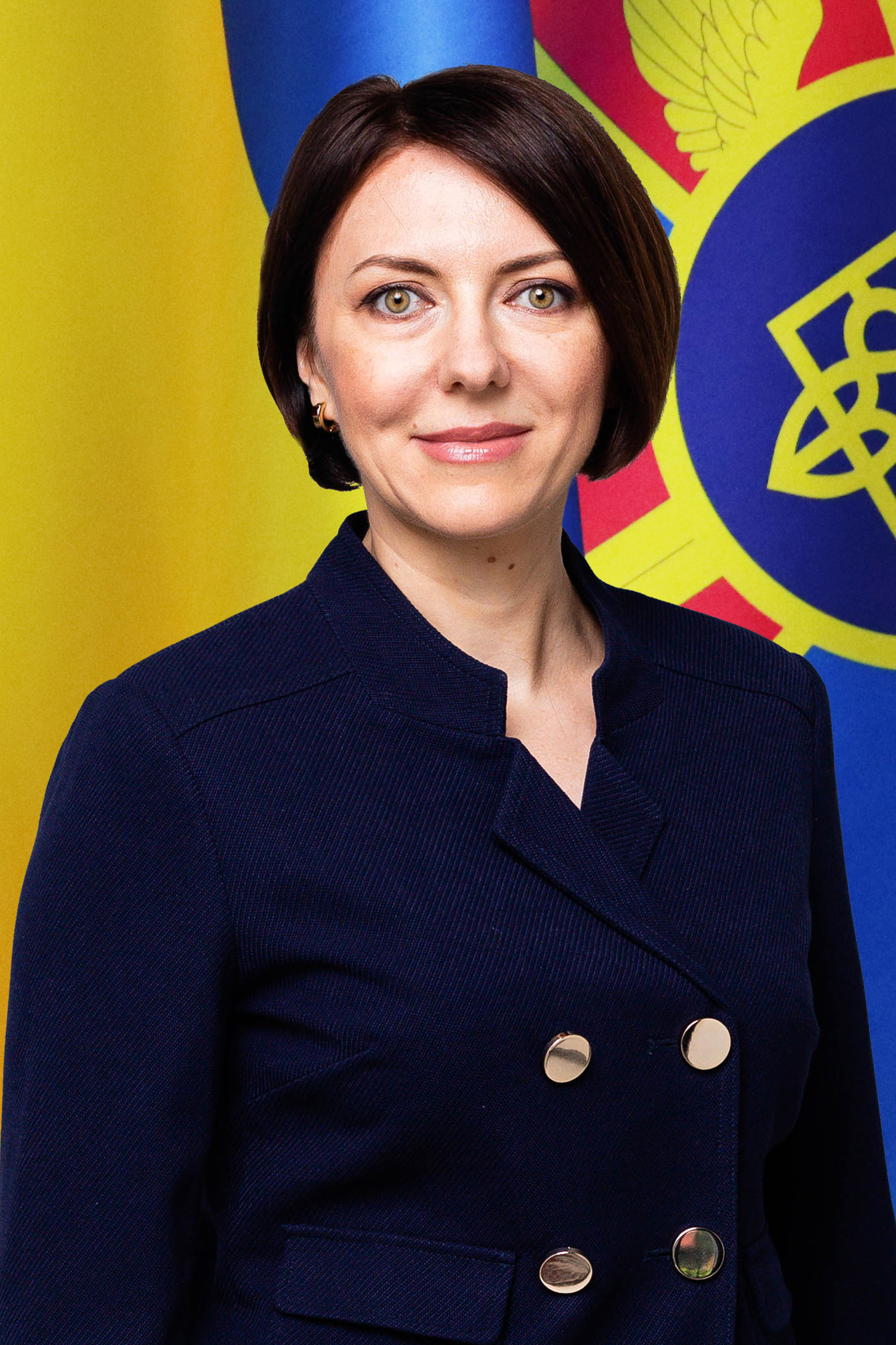
- Maliar in 2020

Deputy Minister of Defense of Ukraine
- In office 4 August 2021 – 18 September 2023
- President: Volodymyr Zelenskyy
- Prime Minister: Denys Shmyhal

Personal details
- Born: 28 July 1978 (age 48) Kiev, Ukrainian SSR, Soviet Union (now Kyiv, Ukraine)
- Education: International Institute of Linguistics and Law

Hanna Vasylivna Maliar (Ukrainian: Ганна Василівна Маляр; born 28 July 1978) is a Ukrainian lawyer and educator who served as one of the several Deputy Ministers of Defense under Prime Minister Denys Shmyhal from 4 August 2021 until 18 September 2023. A graduate of the International Institute of Linguistics and Law in Kyiv, she was a docent at the same institute before she began working for the state. (Note: The International Institute of Linguistics and Law was renamed Kyiv International University in 2002.)

== Early life and education ==
Hanna Maliar was born on 28 July 1978 in Kyiv, which was then part of the Ukrainian Soviet Socialist Republic, a constituent republic of the Soviet Union. She graduated from Kyiv's International Institute of Linguistics and Law in 2000. She earned the right to practice law in 2007.

== Career ==
In 2010, Maliar worked at the State Research Institute of Customs Affairs as deputy head of the Department of Legal Issues.

From 2013 to 2020, she taught at the National School of Judges of Ukraine in the field of criminal-legal qualification of aggressive war and other crimes committed in war zones.

In 2018, she was a trainer of strategic communications units of the Security Service of Ukraine.

Since 2020, she has been a freelance consultant to the (national parliament of Ukraine) Verkhovna Rada Committee on National Security, Defense and Intelligence.

In the 2020 Kyiv local elections Maliar unsuccessfully tried to be elected into the Kyiv City Council as a candidate for (the government party) Servant of the People.

Maliar was appointed to be a deputy Minister of Defense on 4 August 2021, working under Defense Minister Oleksii Reznikov. This was 7 years after Russia unilaterally annexed (the Ukrainian province) Crimea and 7 years after the start of the War in Donbas in Eastern Ukraine.

On 24 February 2022, Russia launched a full scale invasion of Ukraine. During the fourth month of the invasion, Maliar stated that Russia's forces and firepower outsized Ukraine's by about a factor of ten. Around 7 July 2022, Maliar stated that it was not necessary to implement female conscription at the time, and that about 1,000 Ukrainian women had voluntarily mobilized to date.

On 14 September 2023 Maliar was criticized for erroneously reporting Ukrainian successes in the 2023 Ukrainian counteroffensive.

Maliar was dismissed from her post on 18 September 2023 by the Ukrainian government. No official reason was given for her dismissal, but the then recently appointed new Defense Minister of Ukraine Rustem Umierov stated on Facebook that he was "Rebooting" the ministry. She and the five other deputy Defence Ministers were simultaneously dismissed. Under Ukrainian Law, when a minister is dismissed, their deputy ministers are automatically dismissed by the Cabinet of Ministers.

== Personal life ==
Maliar is married and has a son.

She is the author of more than 40 scientific works, and developed the concept of legal assessment of events in Crimea and eastern Ukraine, which is used in investigative and judicial practice.
