= Olena Bilozerska =

Ukrainian sniper and journalist

- Олена Білозерська
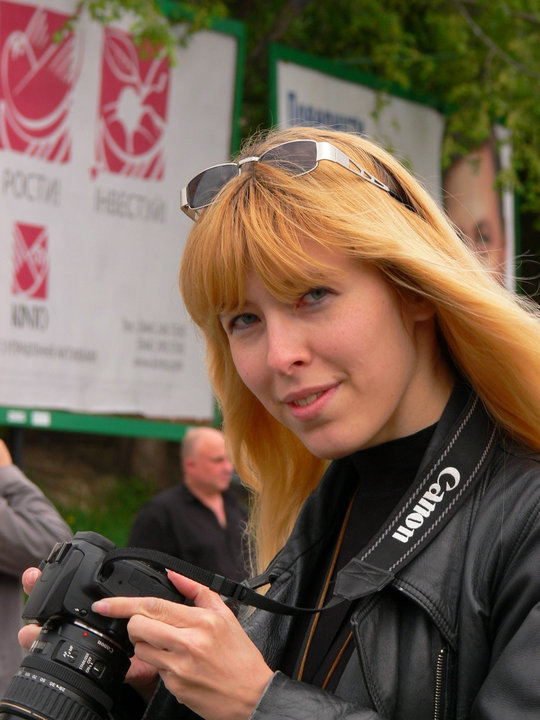
- Born: 5 August 1979 (age 47); Kyiv, Ukrainian SSR
- Citizenship: Ukraine
- Education: Kyiv National University of Culture and Arts
- Occupations: Political activist, journalist, sniper
- Awards
- Military career
- Service years: from 2014
- Conflicts: Russo-Ukrainian War

Olena Leonidivna Bilozerska (Ukrainian: Олена Леонідівна Білозерська; born 5 August 1979) is a Ukrainian sniper and journalist. She served in the Armed Forces of Ukraine and in Ukrainian volunteer battalions during the Russo-Ukrainian War.

== Life ==
Prior to her military service, Bilozerska was a poet and a journalist. In 2011, her apartment was searched by Ukrainian authorities and her electronic devices were confiscated. The search was decried by human rights groups as a violation of freedom of the press, as Bilozerska was not accused of a crime.

Bilozerska saved money for two years to buy her rifle, and she was taught to shoot by her husband in anticipation of military conflict with Russia. She began her military career as a volunteer sniper, serving in the Ukrainian Volunteer Corps from 2014 to 2015. She was first stationed in Dnipro, Ukraine, shortly after the onset of the Russo-Ukrainian War in April 2014.

Bilozerska was involved in the movement to allow women to formally enlist in the Ukrainian military, which was legalized in 2016. She served in the Ukrainian Volunteer Army from 2016 to 2017. She formally joined the Armed Forces of Ukraine as an officer in 2018, and she served as the commander of an artillery platoon for two years in Donetsk.

Bilozerska was featured in the 2017 Ukrainian documentary Invisible Battalion, bringing national attention to female soldiers. She published her account of the Russo-Ukrainian War, Diary of an Illegal Soldier, in 2020. Bilozerska's reputation has made her a common target of Russian web brigades, and the Russian government has falsely announced her death on multiple occasions.

== Awards ==
- Order for Courage 3d class
