= Invisible Battalion =

Ukrainian military gender equality group

Invisible Battalion (Ukrainian: Невидимий Батальйон, romanized: Nevydymyy Batal'yon) is a Ukrainian advocacy campaign, a sociological research group, and a civil rights project for gender equality in the Armed Forces of Ukraine.

== Activities ==
Invisible Battalion was launched in 2015 as a sociological survey coordinated by Maria Berlinska and written by Tamara Martsenyuk, Anna Kvit and Ganna Grytsenko, National University of Kyiv-Mohyla Academy sociologists, on women's participation in the War in Donbass in Eastern Ukraine. The survey revealed a number of problems: Ukrainian legislation didn’t allow women to be assigned to combat positions, so they were enlisted as cooks, seamstresses, cleaners, accountants etc. while taking part in military combat operations as snipers, grenade launcher operators, reconnaissance soldiers, artillerists etc. This was done on semi-legal grounds. Thus, the majority of women who served in the war in Donbass were not enlisted officially and subsequently had no access to social or military benefits, military awards, social status, or career opportunities in the Armed Forces. With the support of Ukrainian Women's Fund and UN Women, the Invisible Battalion survey turned into an ambitious photo project: about half a hundred portraits of Ukrainian women combatants were shot and exhibited at the Ukrainian Parliament and the Ministry of Defense of Ukraine. In 2016 the Invisible Battalion year calendar won the Grand Prix at the National Festival of Social Advertising.

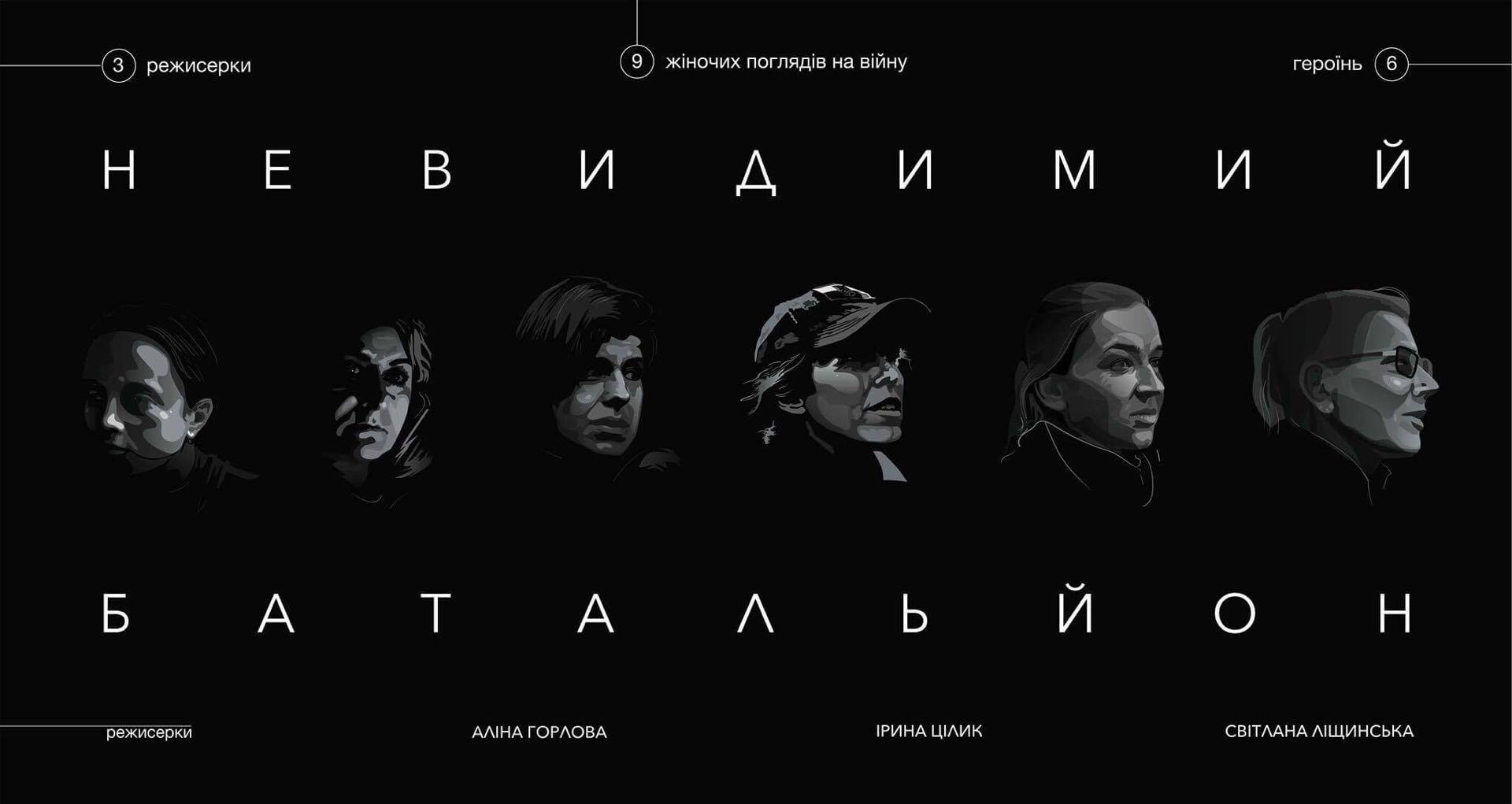
Ukrainian language poster for Invisible Battalion the film

Later on, the Invisible Battalion social project turned into a full-length documentary film, Invisible Battalion: six stories of six women who were (or are) combatants at war in the East of Ukraine. Three women directors–Iryna Tsilyk, Alina Gorlova, and Svitlana Lischynska–offer female perspectives on war in the East of Ukraine.

== Accomplishment ==
As a result of the campaign, the pressure of society and different international organizations, the Ministry of Defense of Ukraine expanded the number of military jobs available to women to 63 with Directive #292, "On expanding military jobs for soldier, sergeant, and officer staff".

== See also ==
- Women in the Ukrainian military
  - Women drone operators in the Ukrainian military
- Yuliia Paievska, one of the women featured
