= Maria Berlinska =

Ukrainian military volunteer and women's rights advocate

- Марія Берлінська
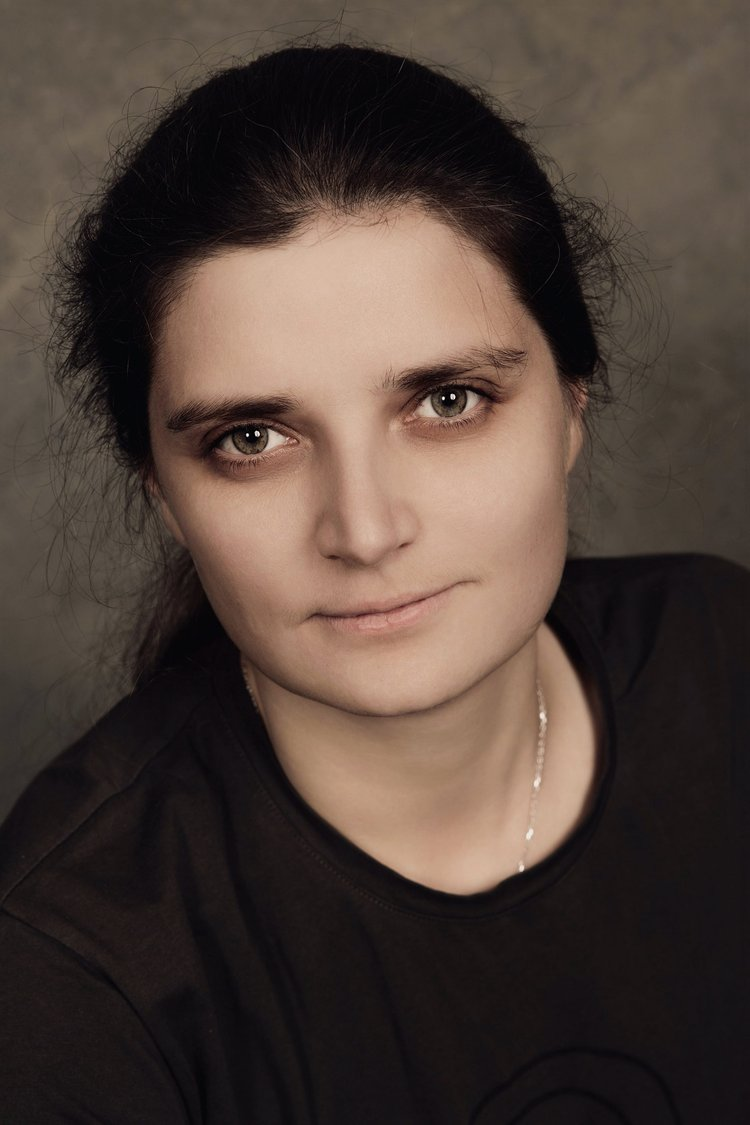
- Berlinska in 2024
- Born: 19 May 1988 (age 38); Kamianets-Podilskyi, Ukrainian SSR, Soviet Union
- Occupations: Military volunteer and women's rights advocate

Mariia Serhiivna Berlinska (Ukrainian: Марія Сергіївна Берлінська; born 1988) is a Ukrainian military volunteer, civic activist, and defense technology advocate. She was a participant in the Revolution of Dignity in 2014 and subsequently volunteered for the war in Donbas as an aerial reconnaissance drone operator. Returning from the front, Berlinska founded a free school to train Ukrainian military personnel and volunteers in aerial reconnaissance.

Since 2015, Berlinska has advocated for women's integration into the Armed Forces of Ukraine. She co-founded the Women's Veteran Movement non-governmental organization, and coordinated the Invisible Battalion, a series of three reports on Ukrainian military women's recognition, reintegration, and harassment, and produced two films on women veterans. This work is credited for a series of laws gradually granting women equality in the Ukrainian armed forces.

Following Russia's full-scale invasion of Ukraine in 2022, she founded the Victory Drones initiative, one of Ukraine's largest drone education projects, and later launched Victory Neurones, an initiative focused on strengthening Ukraine's cognitive warfare capabilities. She has also advocated for expanding the role of emerging technologies in Ukraine's national defense and military modernization.

== Early life ==
Maria Berlinska was born in 1988, and grew up in a village near the city of Kamianets-Podilskyi, 400 kilometres (250 mi) southwest of Kyiv. Her parents were teachers; her father, Serhiy, taught history and literature, and her mother taught French.

Berlinska graduated from Kamyanets-Podilsky Ivan Ohienko National University, and went for a master's degree in history at the National University of Kyiv-Mohyla Academy, specializing in Jewish history.

In her spare time, Berlinska played guitar, and co-organized the annual Respublica (festival) music festivals held at Kamianets-Podilskyi Castle with bands such as Lyapis Trubetskoy and Skryabin, using part of the profits to pay artists to decorate houses in Kamianets-Podilskyi. Berlinska completed her master's in 2015 after a break for the war.

== Activism and military service ==
Berlinska joined the Euromaidan protests on 22 November 2013 and stayed through the Ukrainian Revolution of 2014. She compiled a database of the injured in hospitals, built barricades, delivered water and self-defence leaflets. When she met with gender discrimination from male protesters, she gave speeches on women's rights. Her leg was injured during the protests, and years later she used a walking stick. She was also wounded with rubber bullets and hospitalized for bilateral otitis, sinusitis, and bronchitis due to the cold weather.

=== Military volunteer ===
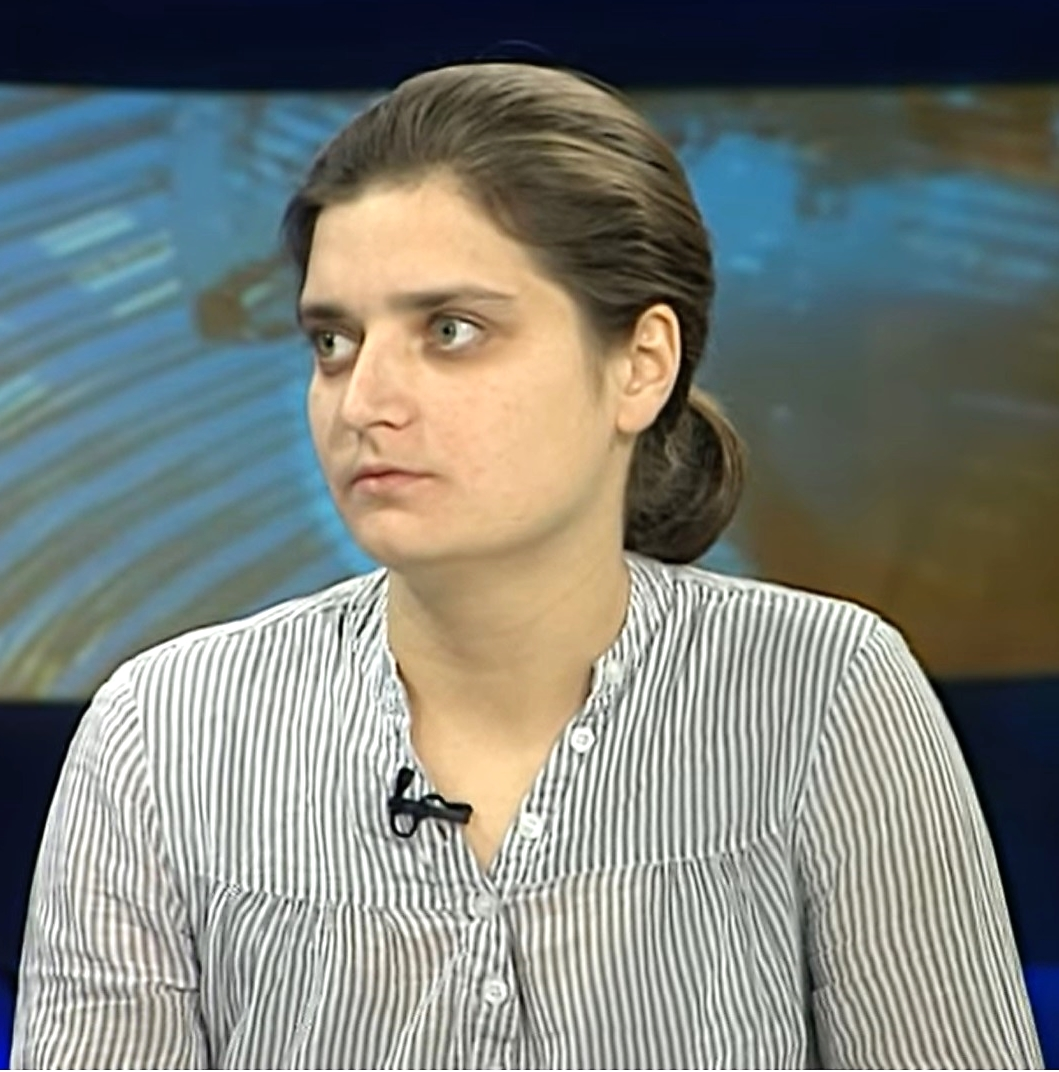
Berlinska on Channel 9 Dnieper in 2016

In mid-2014, Berlinska sought to become involved in the war in Donbas. She joined the Ukrainian Army's volunteer Aidar Battalion after being turned away by other volunteer units on the basis of gender. With the aid of material on the internet, she trained in Kyiv as a pilot of aerial reconnaissance drones. On 1 September, Berlinska left the academy and arrived in Shchastia, at the front, the next day. Her military call sign was "Marie Curie". Berlinska's father also volunteered for the war in Donbas in 2016, but was initially turned down due to his age, 58, until Berlinska intervened on his behalf. He served as a captain in the 24th Mechanized Brigade, and deputy brigade commander for psychological support.

In January 2015, Berlinska founded the Aerial Reconnaissance Support Centre (Ukrainian: Центр підтримки аеророзвідки). This is a free training centre for Ukrainian volunteers, run by volunteer civilian instructors, teaching soldiers how to operate drones, topography, and meteorology in a three to four-week course with donated drones. One of the volunteer teachers, an art director for a television channel, had originally taught Berlinska. By November 2016, the school had trained about 150 soldiers. One of the trainees was Yulia Tolopa, a female Russian volunteer, who assisted Berlinska with drone reconnaissance at the front in mid-2016. An article in The Atlantic called Berlinska "the mother of drones".

Berlinska unsuccessfully went to court in November 2017 to prove her participation in hostilities as a volunteer to obtain moral satisfaction and to serve as an example. The court ruled that she had proven her case, but then the Ministry of Defense appealed and won, since, despite witnesses and photo and video evidence, there were no written orders. However, after this loss, Berlinska was contacted by Ukrainian Defense Minister Stepan Poltorak, who asked for a meeting. After this meeting the Ministry announced plans to increase its own funding for drones and to found its own aerial reconnaissance school in 2018.

=== Invisible Battalion series ===
In 2015, Berlinska became the project coordinator for Invisible Battalion (Ukrainian: Невидимий батальйон), a report examining the participation of women in the Ukrainian armed forces. The title referred to the unknown role of women fighting for Ukraine in the war in Donbas. The report, by Tamara Martsenyuk, Anna Hrytsenko, and Anna Kvit, was presented in Kyiv in December 2015, and was published in English and Ukrainian by UN Women and the Kyiv-Mohyla Law and Politics Journal in 2016.

The report found that female soldiers were forbidden by law from holding military commands, did not have basic needs met, and, despite some women being in combat roles, were all categorized as support personnel. As a result, female soldiers did not receive the same salaries, legal protections, compensation for injuries, post-combat trauma care, and opportunities for career advancement in the military as male personnel. Largely because of the report, the Ministry of Defence issued Decree 337, allowing women to officially serve as snipers, intelligence officers, and commanders of military hardware, and in 2017 opened up 62 combat positions to women.

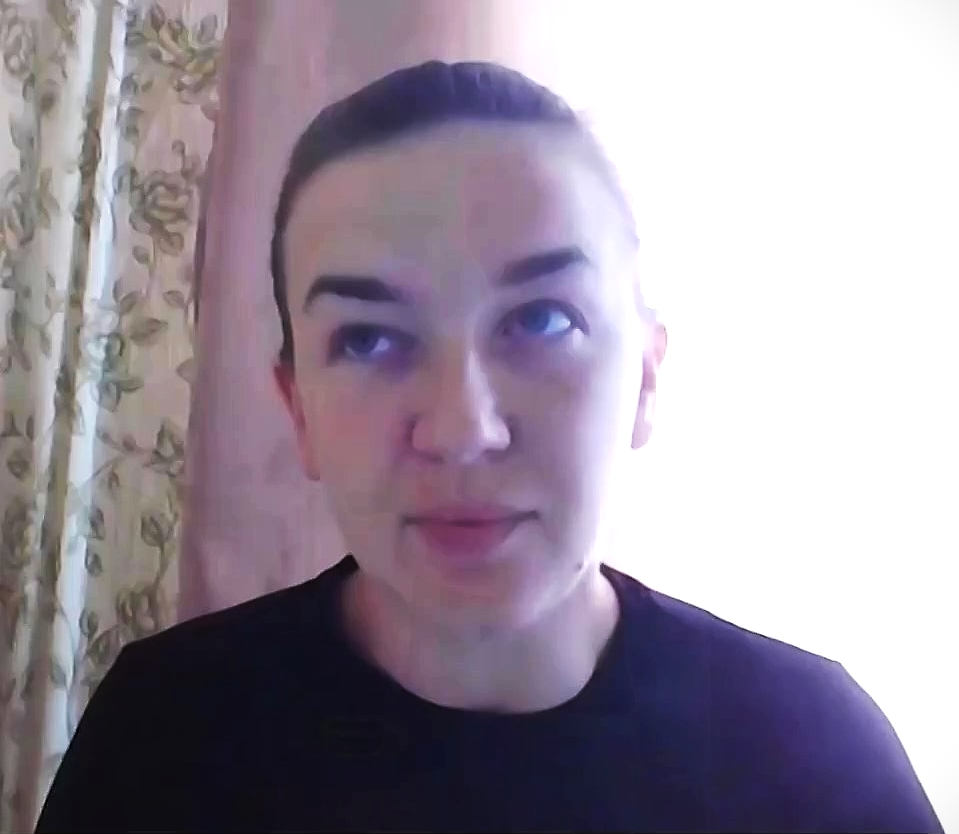
Andriana Susak-Arekhta, featured in Invisible Battalion, co-founder of the Women's Veteran Movement, in 2021

In 2017, Berlinska organized and produced a documentary film also titled Invisible Battalion, profiling six female soldiers who served in the war in Donbass without being recognized for it: Yuliia Paievska, a paramedic; Yulia Matvienko, called "Belka", a sniper, officially listed as a medical assistant; Olena Bilozerska, another sniper, never officially enlisted; Oksana Yakubova, suffering from post-traumatic stress disorder (PTSD); Andriana Susak, who fought to retake Schastia while wearing a balaclava to hide her gender, and was officially listed as a seamstress; and Daria Zubenko, paramedic. It was 89 minutes long, in Ukrainian and Russian with English subtitles. Berlinska did not have any film production training, so again she learned from the Internet. The executive producer was Oksana Ivantsiv, and it was directed by Iryna Tsilyk, Svitlana Lischynska and Alina Gorlova. Each of the directors directed two of the soldiers' stories. The directors worked unpaid. Lischynska directed the two stories about the snipers, which were filmed at the front.

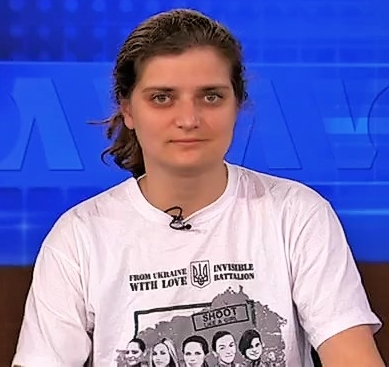
Berlinska was a 2018 guest of Voice of America about the Invisible Battalion

In 2018, Berlinska produced the sequel documentary No Obvious Signs (Ukrainian: Явних проявів немає; referring to the fact that psychological trauma is not as visible as physical wounds), directed by Gorlova, about Yakubova's struggles with PTSD. This film won the MDR Film Prize for Outstanding Eastern European Documentary at the 2018 Dok Leipzig film festival.

In 2018 and again in 2019, Berlinska toured the United States, Canada, and the United Kingdom with several of the women from the Invisible Battalion film to screen the film and promote the Invisible Battalion 2.0 study. This led to a May 2018 confrontation between Berlinska and Susak with Russian diplomat Maxim Buyakevich at the Headquarters of the United Nations in New York City in which Berlinska asked Buyakevich, "Why are you killing our people?". The Russian Foreign Ministry characterized this interaction as the Ukrainians threatening the diplomat with death.

In November 2019, Berlinska and two of the authors of the first Invisible Battalion study published Invisible Battalion 2.0: Women Veterans Returning to Peaceful Life, a follow-up study on how female veterans used Ukraine Government services to reintegrate to civilian status.

In August 2020, Berlinska's Institute of Gender Programs, the NGO founded to continue the "Invisible Battalion" project, began the advocacy campaign "Invisible Battalion 3.0: Sexual Harassment In The Military Sphere In Ukraine". It was a multifaceted campaign, beginning with an anonymous survey of male and female veterans, which showed that 70% had witnessed or been the victims of sexual harassment in the military. There was an online course on the Prometheus educational platform titled "Gender equality and combating sexual harassment in the military sphere" (Ukrainian: Гендерна рівність та протидія сексуальним домаганням у військовій сфері). It was developed by the Invisible Battalion authors Martsenyuk, Hrytsenko, and Kvit, and included recorded lectures from veterans including Berlinska and Bilozerska, and journalists including Yanina Sokolova, and Yuriy Butusov. In November 2021, this course was taken by Police Lieutenant Colonel Konstantin Bugaychuk of the Kharkiv National University of Internal Affairs (the university associated with the Ukrainian Ministry of Internal Affairs). A chatbot running on the Invisible Battalion web site enabled military personnel to receive information and psychological and legal assistance about sexual harassment completely anonymously. In June 2021 the campaign authors and a representative of the Armed Forces of Ukraine delivered a final report with an analysis of current legislation on sexual harassment, with recommendations for legislative changes, and a signed memorandum of cooperation from the General Staff of the Armed Forces.

=== Women's Veteran Movement ===
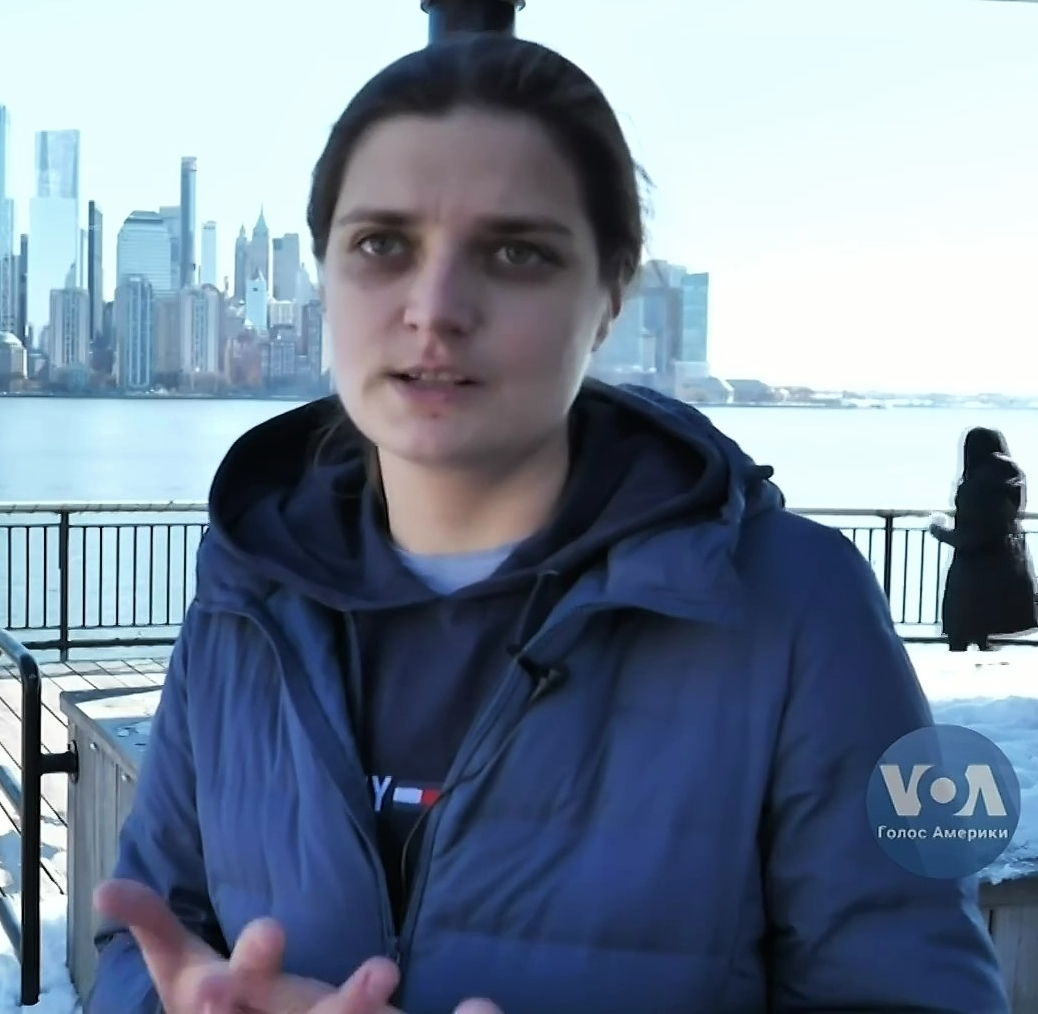
Berlinska speaks with Voice of America about IREX support for veteran reintegration in 2021

2017 saw the beginning of what would become the Women's Veteran Movement (Ukrainian: Жіночий ветеранський рух). At first, these were informal meetings of women veterans in different cities, supported by UN Women and the European Endowment for Democracy. They were inspired by Berlinska's Invisible Battalion project and film. It was officially registered as an NGO in October 2019, with the three founders Berlinska, Andriana Susak-Arekhta and Kateryna Pryimak. In addition to mutual support meetings, the NGO provides psychological rehabilitation for women veterans suffering from PTSD and substance addiction, conducts online training in business, management, and IT courses, helps with gynecological services, and has planted five "Alleys of Memory" in honor of dead women veterans in Kramatorsk, Kyiv, Lviv, Cherkasy and Zhytomyr.

In September 2018, the Ukrainian parliament passed law 2523-VIII equalizing the capabilities of men and women in the military; Berlinska was a co-author.

In 2021, Berlinska served as a senior technical advisor and program director for the IREX program to reintegrate Ukrainian veterans into civilian society.

By 2021, over 15% of the Ukrainian armed forces were female, over twice the proportion in 2014. However, when in July 2021 the Ministry of Defense released images of women Ukrainian cadets marching in high heels, it met with widespread international criticism, and citing Berlinska; the subsequent photos had the women in combat boots.

== During Russia’s Full-Scale Invasion (2022–present) ==
Since 2022, Berlinska expanded her activities to drone education and defense technology advocacy, and later to efforts to strengthen Ukraine's cognitive capabilities.

=== Victory Drones initiative ===
Following Russia's invasion of Ukraine in February 2022, Berlinska restructured the Aerial Reconnaissance Support Centre and relaunched it under the name Victory Drones. Beginning in 2023, the project operated under the umbrella of the Dignitas Fund, co-founded by Mariia Berlinska and Lyuba Shipovich.

The project's stated mission is the technological militarization of society: building a broad civilian and military base capable of developing, operating, and sustaining drone systems. In an interview with The Ukrainian Weekly in 2024, Berlinska stated that the creation of a technological defense ecosystem in Ukraine would ensure preparedness for possible future Russian attacks.

Victory Drones runs training programs in drone piloting, drone assembly, engineering instruction, and training in aerial intelligence software, including Ukraine's digital combat and situational awareness systems Kropyva and Delta. Berlinska described the initiative's mission as training individual operators and building a broader community capable of exchanging tactical and engineering knowledge. By the first half of 2024, the Victory Drones had trained 92,000 service members in drone operation. As of January 2025, it has trained 5,000 specialists in FPV drones alone.

Berlinska publicly called for every Ukrainian soldier to be able to operate a drone as routinely as a rifle, and highlighted women's particular suitability for drone warfare given that it minimizes reliance on physical strength. A dedicated program to train female FPV operators ran alongside the general courses.

In November 2023, Berlinska's team launched the People's FPV (Ukrainian: Народний FPV) project to widen Ukraine's drone engineering base. The free online course walked participants through FPV drone assembly and configuration. Graduates purchased components, built the drones, and submitted them to Victory Drones for quality testing before driving them to the front. In January 2024, the Deputy Prime Minister Mykhailo Fedorov publicly called on Ukrainians to join the initiative. By that time, approximately 9,000 people had enrolled.

=== Advocacy and policy positions ===
Berlinska was a consistent public critic of what she characterized as insufficient state prioritization of military technology. She called for greater state support for Ukrainian defence-technology manufacturers and the removal of bureaucratic barriers to importing components.

She also conducted advocacy trips to the United States in April and September 2022, to advocate for weapons and technology support, establishing and maintaining contacts with members of Congress, American government officials, and defense stakeholders.

=== Cognitive warfare and Victory Neurones ===
From late 2025 onward, Berlinska increasingly advocated for strengthening Ukraine's capabilities in cognitive warfare, arguing that future conflicts would be decided not only by military technologies but also by influence over human perception, decision-making, and societal resilience. In 2026, she founded Victory Neurones, an initiative dedicated to advancing Ukraine's cognitive capabilities by bringing together experts in strategic communications, cybersecurity, information operations, behavioral science, and technology. According to Berlinska, the initiative was intended to complement Ukraine's technological advances in drone warfare by developing national capacity in the cognitive domain.

== Honors ==
In November 2015, Berlinska was awarded the Euromaidan SOS volunteer award. In December 2017, the Kyiv Post gave her its "Top 30 Under 30" award. In July 2019, the Embassy of the United States, Kyiv included her in an exhibit paying tribute to 19 Ukrainian and 29 American outstanding women. In 2020, she was listed among the 100 most influential women of Ukraine according to Focus magazine and the readers of its website.

In 2023, Maria Berlinska was included in Forbes Ukraine's “50 Leaders of Ukraine” list and was also named among Ukrainska Pravda's "UP100" leaders. In 2024, she was included in the "UP100: The Power of Women" list by the same publication.

In 2024, Berlinska was also awarded the “Golden Heart” distinction by the President of Ukraine for her personal contribution to the development of the volunteer movement, including efforts to support Ukraine’s defense, protect the population, and safeguard state interests in the context of the Russian military aggression against Ukraine.
