= Invisible Battalion (film) =

2017 Ukrainian documentary film

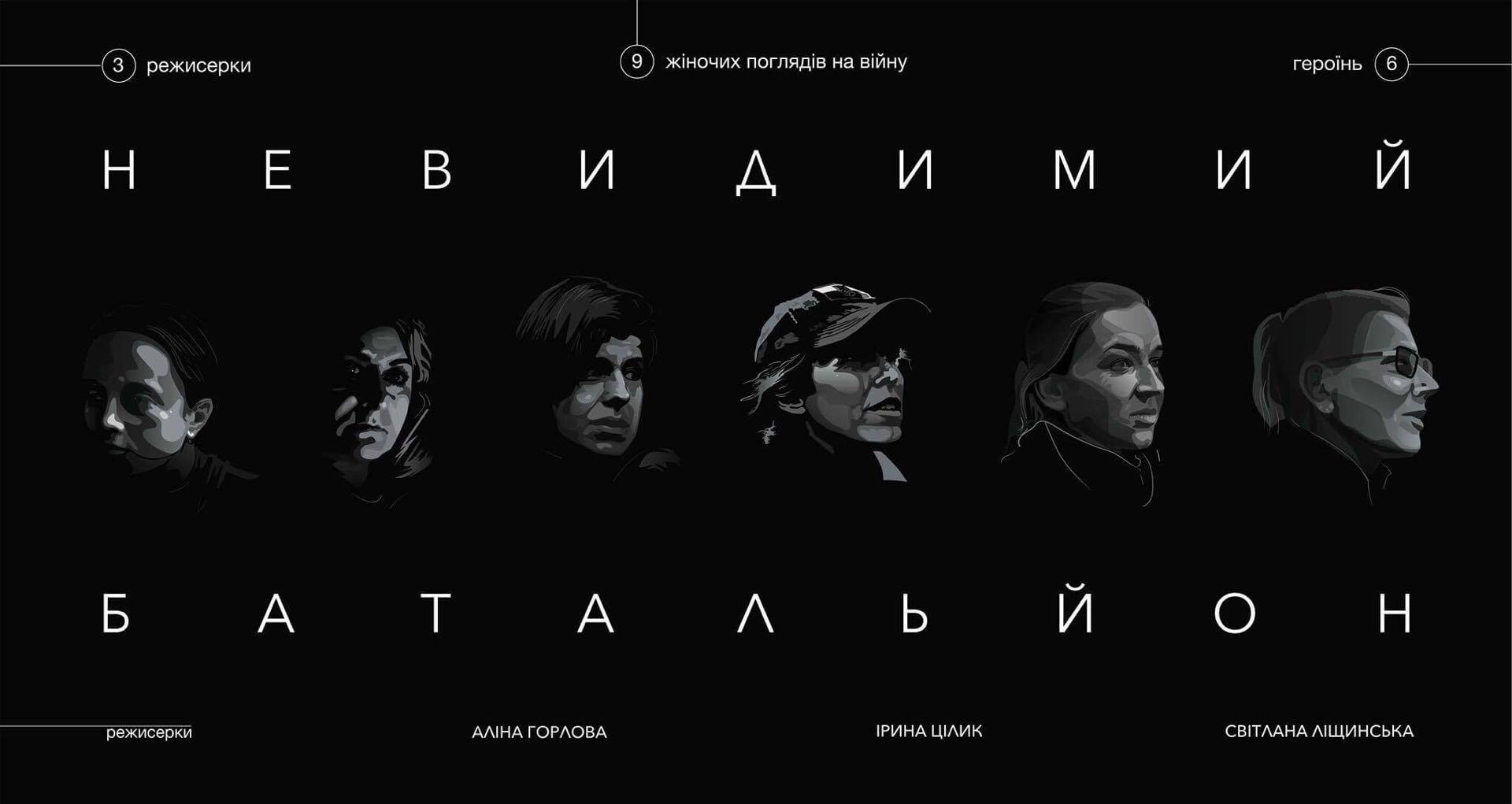
- Directed by: Alina Gorlova; Svitlana Lishchinska; Iryna Tsilyk
- Country of origin: Ukraine
- Original languages: Ukrainian, Russian

Production
- Producer: Maria Berlinska
- Running time: 1 hr. 29 min.

Original release
- Release: 16 October 2017

Invisible Battalion (Ukrainian: «Невидимий батальйон», romanized: Nevydymyi batalion) is a documentary film by Ukrainian directors Alina Gorlova, Svitlana Lishchinska, and Iryna Tsilyk. The documentary is part of the Invisible Battalion social project and is about six Ukrainian women who were combatants in the Russo-Ukrainian War.

== Release ==
Invisible Battalion premiered on 1+1 on 16 October 2017, then played at the Oscar Cinema in Kyiv on 24 November.
