= Irina Zherebkina =

Ukrainian feminist academic

- Occupation: Academic, philosopher, university teacher
- Employer: VN Karazin Kharkiv National University

Irina Anatoliyivna Zherebkina (born 1959) is a Ukrainian feminist academic. She is Professor of Theory of Culture and Philosophy of Science at V. N. Karazin Kharkiv National University, and the permanent director of the Kharkiv Center for Gender Studies (KhCGS), which she helped found in 1994.

== Life ==
Zherebkina studied philosophy in Kyiv and at the start of the 1990s worked at the Institute of Philosophy, Russian Academy of Sciences in Moscow. She helped found the Kharkiv Center for Gender Studies in 1994.

An anti-nationalist, Zherebkina sees nationalism as an imagined community held together by imagined "loss" or "lack": a loss of territorial integrity encourages myths of national identity, which in transitional societies provide mystifying symbolic compensation for those disoriented by the passing of old social structures. In Women's political unconscious, she distances herself from nationalist Ukrainian feminism, seeing romantic images of self-sacrificial "mothers of the nation" as trapping women in mystifying social roles akin to symbolic "rape".

In March 2022, with Kharkiv under siege by Russian forces after the 2022 Russian invasion of Ukraine, Zherebkina wrote a 'Dispatch from Kharkiv National University' for the Boston Review, in which she reflected on the importance of women's studies across post-Soviet countries as a whole. She appealed for "a struggle of all of us against the warmongers", rather than some misconstrued "struggle between 'Russian truth' and 'European truth'".

Zherebkina managed to leave Ukraine for London in March 2023 as she was offered a position by the London School of economics.

== Works ==
- Женское политическое бессознательное [Women's political unconscious]. Kharkiv, 1996. Republished in Saint Petersburg: Aleteia, 2002.
- (ed.) Femina postsovietica: украинская женщина в переходный период: от социальных движений к политике [Femina postsovietica. Ukrainian woman in transition: from social movements to politics]. Kharkiv, 1999.
- Страсть: женское тело и женская сексуальность в России [Passion: the female body and female sexuality in Russia]. Saint Petersburg: Aleteia, 2001.
- Гендерные 90-е, или Фаллоса не существует [Gender 90s, or, the Phallus does not exist]. Saint Petersburg: Aleteia, 2003.
- Феминистская интервенция в сталинизм, или, Сталина не существует [Feminist intervention in Stalinism, or, Stalin does not exist]. Saint Petersburg: Aleteia, 2006.
