= Tamara Martsenyuk =

Ukrainian sociologist

- Тамара Олегівна Марценюк
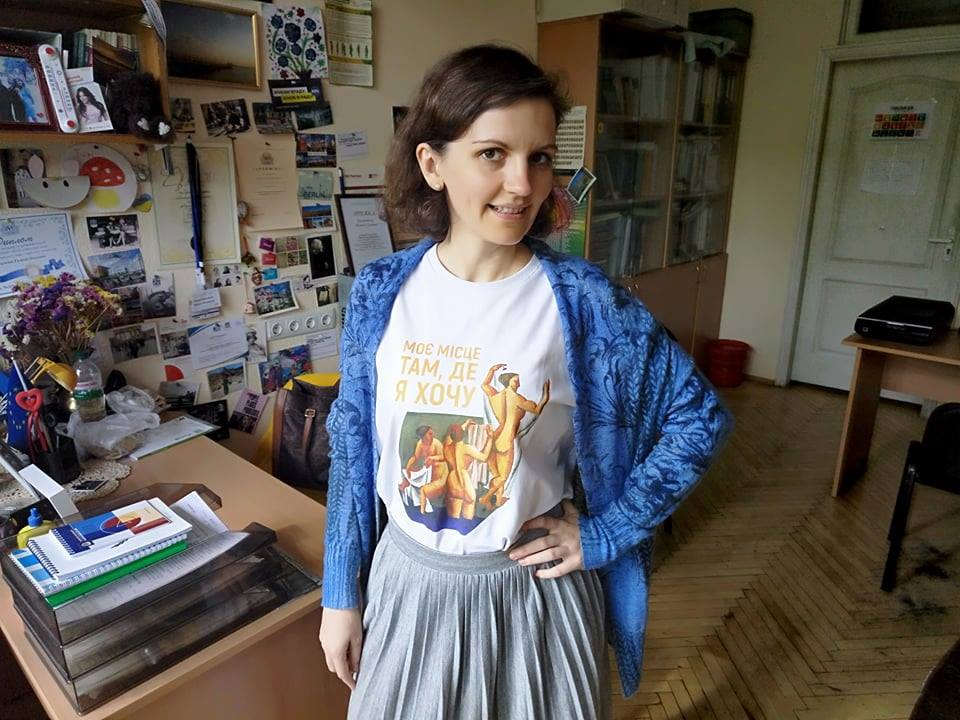
- Martsenyuk, 2019
- Born: 2 July 1981 (age 45); Volyn Oblast

Academic background
- Education: National University of Kyiv-Mohyla Academy, University of Oslo

Academic work
- Discipline: sociology

Tamara Olehivna Martsenyuk (Ukrainian: Тамара Олегівна Марценюк) is a Ukrainian sociologist and academic who specializes in gender studies.

She is known for her writing, her analysis of the role of women in the Euromaidan protests and for her critique of president Viktor Yanukovych's comments on women in Ukraine.

== Early life ==
Martsenyuk is from Volyn and grew up in the Troieshchyna neighborhood of Kyiv, Ukraine.

== Education ==
She has a PhD in sociology from the National University of Kyiv-Mohyla Academy and studied at the University of Oslo.

She completed a scholarship at the University of Gothenburg, and a postdoctoral fellowship at Stanford University's Centre for Russian, East European and Eurasian Studies.

== Career ==
Since 2004, Martsenyuk has worked at the department of sociology at Ukraine's National University of Kyiv-Mohyla Academy where she currently is an assistant professor focused on gender studies, feminism as a social theory and a social movement gender and politics, masculinity and men's studies.

She has taught in the US (both Stanford University and Columbia University) Canada, Germany (at the European University Viadrina), the United Kingdom, Finland, Estonia, Belgium, Lithuania, Hungary, Austria, Czech Republic, Poland.

Together with Maria Berlinska and other women, Martsenyuk launched the Invisible Battalion project in 2015 advocating for gender equality in the Armed Forces of Ukraine.

== Views ==
Martsenyuk was critical of comments made by Viktor Yanukovych at the 2011 World Economic Forum meeting which she described as an endorsement of sex tourism in Ukraine.

Her co-authored paper Mothers and Daughters of the Maidan discussed the role of women in the Euromaidan protests, pointing out that the majority of protestors were women between late November 2013 and Early January 2014, prior to the subsequent escalations in violence and militarization. With Olga Onuch, she also reported the increasing influence of non-Ukrainians at the protests.

== Selected publications ==
=== Books ===
- Гендер для всіх: виклик стереотипам (English: Gender for All: A Challenge to Stereotypes) (2017)
- Чому не варто боятися фемінізму? (English: Why Not Be Afraid of Feminism?) (2018)

=== Academic writing ===
- Genderna sotsiologiia Maidanu: Rol zhinok u protestah (Sociology of gender of the Maidan: The role of women in protests) (Kyiv: Electronic Archive of the National University of Kyiv-Mohyla Academy, 2014), http://ekmair.ukma.edu.ua/handle/123456789/3511.
- Olga Onuch and Tamara Martsenyuk, Mothers and Daughters of the Maidan: Gender, Repertoires of Violence, and the Division of Labour in Ukrainian Protests", Social, Health, and Communication Studies Journal, 1 (November 2014), 105–26, 113.
- Martsenyuk, Tamara (July 2022). "Women's Participation in Defending Ukraine in Russia's War" (PDF). Global Cooperation Research – A Quarterly Magazine. University of Duisburg-Essen: 5.
