= Conscription in Ukraine =

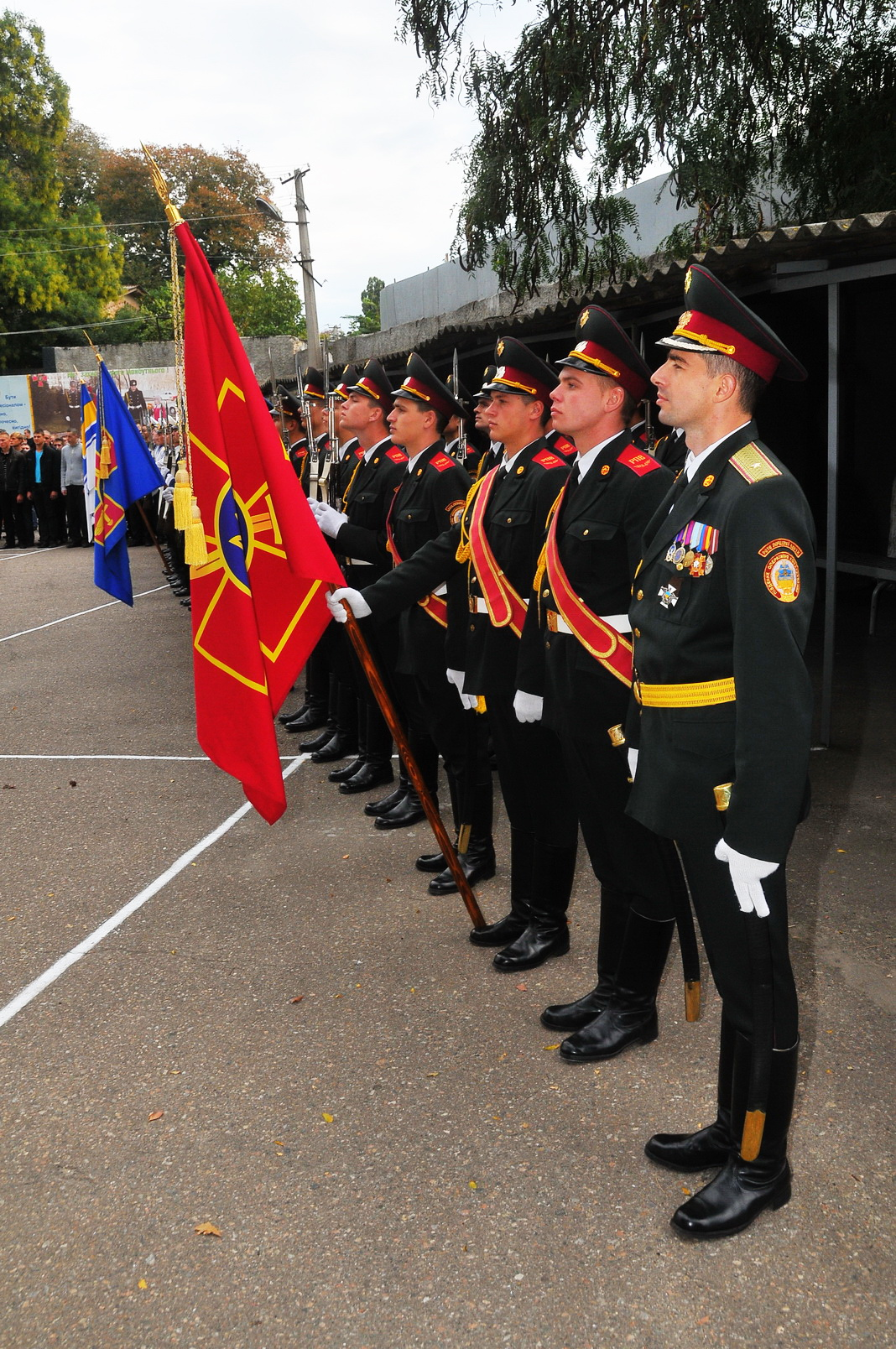
Ukrainian conscripts in 2009

Conscription of men into the armed forces of Ukraine starts at the age of 25. Conscription became a part of the ongoing mobilization that is enforced by press-ganging and rounding up eligible men into the army. This process has become known as "Busification" due to the use of buses by Territorial Recruitment Center officers. The freshly conscripted men are sent to the training centers to prepare for war with Russia.

After serving their term of service, Ukraine's conscripts become part of the inactive reserve and are eligible to be recalled for mobilization in Ukraine until they reach age 55, age 60 for officers. During the war in Donbas, Ukraine instated a partial mobilization to fill needed positions in its armed forces, recalling conscripts who had served before. Because of the war, many conscripts have also been forced to serve longer than their original 18-month term of service. It was planned that in 2015, Ukraine would undergo three waves of partial mobilization, allowing new troops to replace those serving beyond their original term of service.

Women are exempt from conscription, described by some as discrimination against men. Since 1 October 2023, women with medical or pharmaceutical training have been required to register for military service, and those fit to serve are considered liable for military service. Individuals with a moderate autism spectrum disorder are considered eligible for conscription. However, they are assigned to non-combat roles rather than serving on the front line.

Draft dodging is present in Ukraine, as with most nations using the draft. It was reported that between April and August 2014, over 1,000 criminal inquiries into draft evasion were opened in Ukraine. Draft evasion can be problematic because, unless a male citizen was unable to serve for medical reasons, an application to receive an international passport of Ukraine may be denied due to a lack of military service, thus preventing the individual from traveling abroad.

In April 2024, President Zelenskyy signed new conscription laws, passed by the national legislature, that lowered the conscription age by two years, from 27 to 25, and included other provisions that made it easier for the government to conscript eligible persons and harder for draft dodgers to evade conscription. Objections included complaints from families of active service personnel who resented that the laws did not ultimately include an initially considered provision to allow soldiers who had served for 36 months in combat to be relieved and returned home. However, the battle conditions—with Russia advancing with overwhelming force—made it impractical, in the view of Ukraine's leaders, to remove any experienced, active troops from service. Officials pledged the relief provision would be considered in future legislation, without stating when.

== Crisis ==
Mobilization to the Armed Forces of Ukraine to combat the Russian invasion of Ukraine has resulted in a conscription crisis in the country. Among these include efforts from Ukrainian citizens to dodge draft orders and hide or escape the country, legislation to penalize draft evaders and require Ukrainian citizens to register information to streamline draft processes, and the employment of Territorial Recruitment Office (TCC) soldiers to enroll Ukrainians into training with efforts from citizens to resist. There have been cases of forced conscription, sometimes referred to as busification.

The need to maintain enough troops to fight on the frontline in Ukraine to prevent Russia from advancing and jeopardizing Ukrainian sovereignty while adhering to democratic principles and human rights created a difficult policy balance that resulted in strong internal politicization and controversy.

== History ==
=== War in Donbas ===
In October 2013, President Viktor Yanukovych ended conscription in Ukraine. At the time 60% of Ukraine's forces were composed of professional soldiers. However, due to the War in Donbas, conscription, as well as a partial mobilization, was reinstated in 2014. Ukraine modified the age group of males eligible for conscription for 2015 from 18–25 to the 20–27 age group. In the autumn of 2016, longer deployment of mobilized servicemen to combat area in the east of Ukraine was ceased.

On 1 February 2022, President Volodymyr Zelenskyy announced the changing of the military training system, leading to the end of conscription by 1 January 2024. By the same date, there would be an increase in the number of professional servicemen by 100,000, to be achieved by better pay, with all military personnel to be guaranteed at least three times the minimum wage, and better housing provision. However, the 2022 Russian invasion of Ukraine upended those plans, along with massive popular mobilization into the Territorial Defence Forces.

=== Russian Invasion of Ukraine ===
On 28 February 2022, President Zelenskyy offered release for prisoners with combat experience if they join the fight against Russia. In early 2024, Registered draft law No. 11079 was passed which allowed for convicts to be drafted into the Ukrainian Armed Forces. Some convicts said that they had only had 20 days of training before being sent to the frontline.

Over the course of the war, several men with disabilities have been drafted.

In December 2023, according to a report from the New York Times, Ukrainian recruitment officers have confiscated the passports of Ukrainian men.

In June 2024, the Ukrainian Ministry of Defense reported that the ratio of volunteer soldiers to conscripts was 1 to 3.

As of late August 2024, Ukrainian commanders blamed recent Russian advances in Donetsk on newly mobilised Ukrainian soldiers. They blamed the conscripts for having poor training, retreating too easy, not shooting at the enemy or simply walking away from a battle.

A commander with the 47th Mechanized Brigade said “Some people don’t want to shoot. They see the enemy in the firing position in trenches but don’t open fire. That is why our men are dying… When they don’t use the weapon, they are ineffective.”

The Guardian reported that some Ukrainian conscripts only had 45 days of basic training before being sent off to the front. A soldier from the 42nd Mechanized Brigade who goes by the callsign "Chirva", told The Washington Post that many scouts in his unit had only been given 14 days of training before being sent into combat in Kharkiv Oblast.

By 15 September 2024, Ukraine announced it would extend the basic training of its conscripts from three months to a longer, but unspecified period of time, after repeated complaints about the effectiveness of newly recruited Ukrainian soldiers. The new basic training program was scheduled to start in October–November, according to the Ukrainian military commander Colonel-General Oleksandr Syrskyi.

On 29 October 2024, Ukrainian National Security and Defense Council Secretary Oleksandr Lytvynenko reported that 1,000,050 Ukrainian men had been conscripted into the Armed Forces since 24 February 2022 and that a further 160,000 were in the process of being drafted. In comparison, 600,000 to 800,000 Ukrainians had voluntarily joined the Ukrainian Armed Forces between 24 February 2022 and 25 April 2025 according to Ukrainian president Volodymyr Zelenskyy.

On 8 July 2025, the Council of Europe’s Commissioner for Human Rights published a report which said there were systemic human rights violations during mobilization, which included reports of beatings, selective recruitment, and the conscription of men with disabilities. According to Dmytro Lubinets, the Ukrainian parliament's commissioner for human rights, there were 3,500 complaints made about human rights violations committed during mobilization in 2024 and more than 2,000 complaints made between January and July 2025.

According to CNN, some of the Ukrainian men who were deported by the United States Immigration and Customs Enforcement were sent straight to a training center after arriving in Ukraine.

On 17 April 2026, Kyiv Oblast Draft Center, citing information from the Ukrainian National Police, stated that at least 620 enlistment officers had been attacked between 24 February 2022 and 12 April 2026.

According to an estimate made by Ukrainian commanders in September 2024, 50% to 70% of Ukrainian conscripts in some conflict areas were killed or wounded in their first few days in combat.
