= 110th Mechanized Brigade =

Ukrainian Ground Forces unit

- 110-та окрема механізована бригада
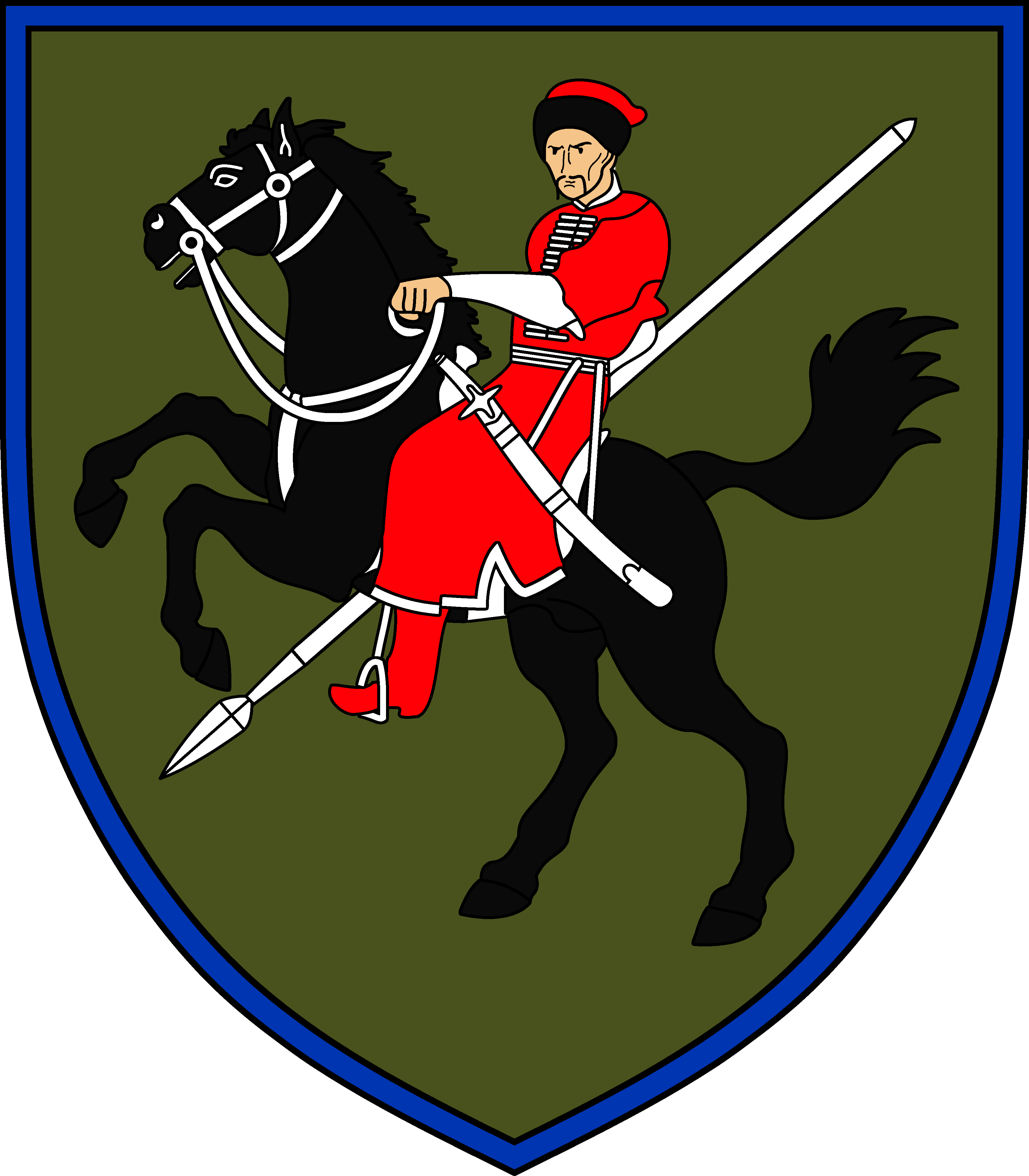
- Shoulder sleeve insignia
- Founded: March 8, 2022
- Country: Ukraine
- Branch: Ukrainian Ground Forces
- Role: Mechanized Infantry
- Part of: Operational Command North
- Patron: Marko Bezruchko
- Equipment: BMP-1, YPR-765, 152 mm SpGH DANA, RM-70 Vampire
- Engagements: Russo-Ukrainian War; Russian invasion of Ukraine; Battle of Avdiivka; Pokrovsk offensive; Velyka Novosilka offensive

Commanders
- Current commander: Vacant
- Notable commanders: Serhiy Zakharevych † (February–July 2025)

The 110th Mechanized Brigade named after Marko Bezruchko (Ukrainian: 110-та окрема механізована бригада імені Марка Безручка) is a brigade of the Ukrainian Ground Forces formed in 2022. Since then, it has gained prominence for its part in the battle of Avdiivka, where it fought for almost two years before being ordered to retreat in February 2024.

== History ==
=== 2022 ===
The brigade was formed in March 2022, shortly after the start of the Russian invasion of Ukraine. Soon after its formation, the brigade was deployed in Avdiivka, and defended the city, as well as the Avdiivka Coke Plant, until it was captured in February of 2024.

On August 24, 2022, the brigade received the honorary name of Marko Bezruchko, a General of the Ukrainian National Republic who led the defense, against the Russian SFSR offensive, of the Polish city of Zamość in August-September 1920.

=== 2023 ===
As the fighting for Avdiivka intensified in October 2023, the brigade successfully repelled multiple Russian assaults, mostly around the AKHZ plant and the village of Stepove, where the 47th Mechanized Brigade was deployed.

In late 2023, soldiers defending Avdiivka started to suffer from a lack of artillery ammunition. FPV drones were able to partially compensate for the lack of artillery shells, but were limited by their range and vulnerability to bad weather. Many observers blamed the lack of ammunition on members of the US Republican Party, who opposed an aid package worth $61 billion proposed by president Joe Biden.

=== 2024 ===
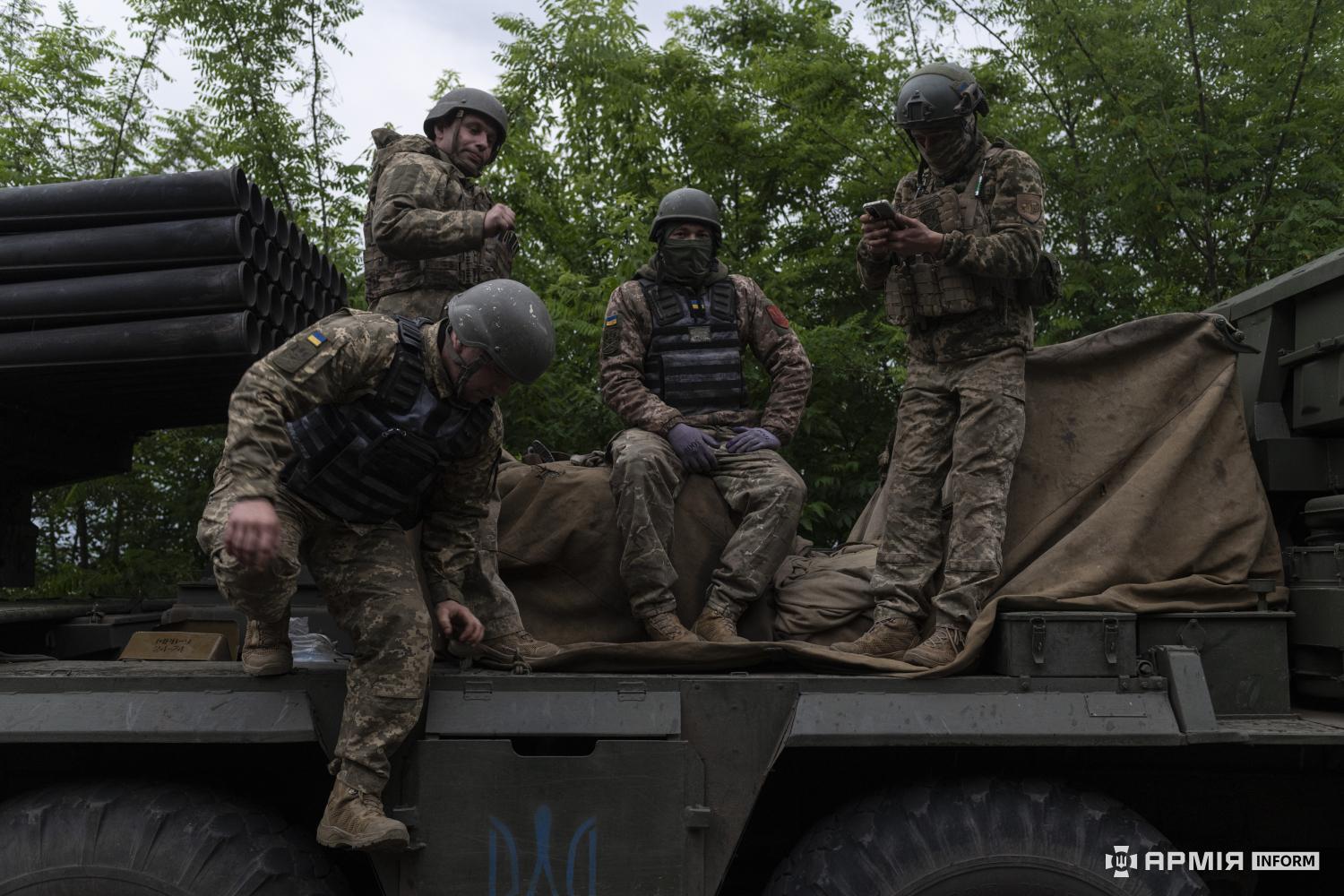
Soldiers of the 110th Brigade in 2024

On February 4, 2024, Russian troops took advantage of cloudy weather conditions and broke through the 110th Brigade's positions, gaining a foothold in the northern part of the city. The brigade suffered significant losses, as Russian servicemen captured positions close to the main road in and out of Avdiivka.

On 13 February 2024, the 110th Mechanized Brigade was rotated out of Avdiivka after having defended the city non-stop since March 2022. The 3rd Assault Brigade was deployed to the city to cover the retreat.

The brigade returned to combat in May 2024, two months after being rotated out of Avdiivka.

On 20 May 2024 the Poltava city council renamed a street in its city in honour of the brigade, the Heroes of the 110th Brigade Street.

As of July 2024, the brigade was defending against Russia's Pokrovsk offensive.

=== 2025 ===
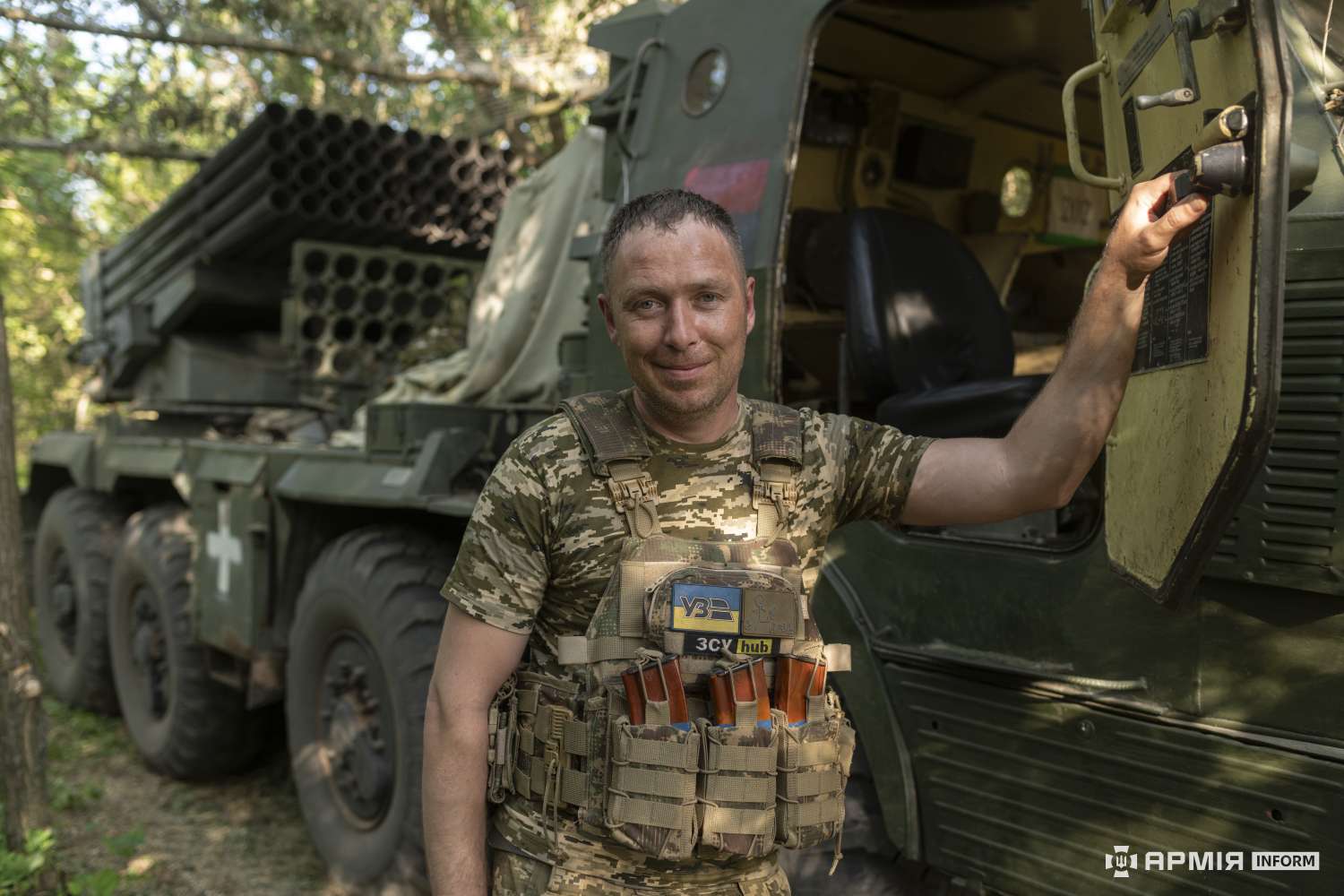
110th Brigade soldier with a Czechoslovak RM-70 multiple rocket launcher

As of 23 January 2025, during the Russian assault on Velyka Novosilka, the 110th Brigade didn't get the time to withdraw from the southern part. On 31 January, the brigade command announced they were critically short of infantry personnel. An officer of the brigade declared that soldiers went absent without leave (AWOL) "pretty frequently".

In February 2025, following the fall of Velyka Novosilka, brigade commander Ihor Hubarenko was replaced by Colonel Serhiy Zakharevych, who had previously been the deputy commander of the 33rd Mechanized Brigade. Zakharevych was killed by a Russian missile strike on the village of Huliaipole in Dnipropetrovsk oblast on 1 July, 2025.

In December 2025, the brigade's deputy commander, who had been detained in December 2024, was put on trial for extortion along with five other soldiers. According to the Ukrainian State Bureau of Investigation, the group set up a scheme that allowed servicemen of the brigade not to report for duty while still being registered as members of the unit and receiving full pay, half of which was to be transferred to the deputy commander. Those who refused to pay were sent to the most dangerous parts of the front. The total damage caused to the state was estimated at around five million hryvnias.

== Structure ==
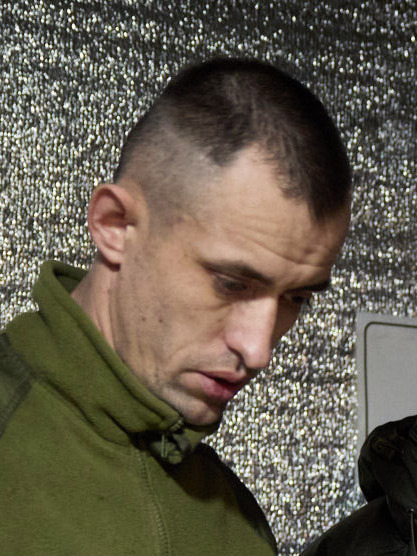
Mykola Chumak in Avdiivka on 20 December 2023

As of 2024, the brigade's structure is as follows:

- 110th Mechanized Brigade,
  - Brigade Headquarters & Headquarters Company
  - 1st Mechanized Battalion
  - 2nd Mechanized Battalion
  - 3rd Mechanized Battalion
  - 12th Separate Rifle Battalion
  - Tank Battalion
  - Field Artillery Regiment
    - Headquarters & Target Acquisition Battery
    - 1st Self-propelled Artillery Battalion (152 mm SpGH DANA)
    - 2nd Artillery Battalion (122-mm howitzer D-30)
    - Rocket Artillery Battalion (RM-70 Vampire)
    - Anti-Tank Artillery Battalion
  - Unmanned Systems Battalion
  - Anti-Aircraft Defense Battalion
  - Reconnaissance Company
  - Engineer Battalion
  - Transmissions Company
  - Radar Company
  - Medical Company
  - Chemical, Biological, Radiological and Nuclear Defense Company
  - Maintenance Battalion (BREM-2 ARVs)
  - Commandant's Platoon
  - Logistics Battalion
