= TCK =

TCK has several meanings:

- Third Culture Kid, a term in sociology describing children who grow up in cultures other than those of their parents.
- Technology Compatibility Kit, for Java programming language
- Tecktonik, a form of dance
- Teck Resources, NYSE stock symbol is TCK
- Territorial Center of Recruitment and Social Support
- General Directorate of Highways (Turkey) abbreviation
- A type of thermocouple
