= 2022 Ukrainian mobilization =

Process of gathering forces for the Ukraine–Russia war

The 2022 Ukrainian mobilization is the ongoing general mobilization of Ukraine's armed forces, declared on 24 February 2022 in response to the Russia's invasion of Ukraine. Hundreds of thousands volunteered in the first weeks of the invasion. Martial law was declared and men aged 18 to 60 were liable for military service unless entitled to a deferral and barred those liable from leaving the country.

Recruitment slowed as the war became a positional conflict with high casualties. In December 2023, President Volodomyr Zelenskyy stated that the mobilization of up to 500,000 additional personnel was anticipated. The figure was a point of disagreement with the military leadership. Ukrainian authorities have opened approximately 9,000 criminal cases for draft evasion, and servicemen with long front-line service have sought fixed terms and demobilization.

Territorial recruitment centres served draft notices in public places, and videos circulated on social media showing recruiters detaining men or removing them from trains and buses. Purchased medical exemptions were widespread, and Zelenskyy dismissed the heads of all regional recruitment offices on 11 August 2023.

== 2022 ==
President Volodymyr Zelenskyy signed decree 24 February 2022 No. 64/2022 "On the imposition of martial law in Ukraine" on general mobilization in the country, which would commence on 25 February for a period of 90 days, calling up conscripts and reservists; all male Ukrainian citizens aged 18 to 60 were prohibited from travelling abroad, unless they could provide documents that they fulfilled specified conditions for exemption. Mobilization was carried out in all regions. The General Staff had to determine the "order and volume" of those mobilized, and the government had to provide the necessary funding. The heads of regional administrations had to "ensure the creation and operation of regional, district and city medical commissions," the decree specified. In May 2022, the Verkhovna Rada (Ukraine's national parliament) extended martial law and mobilization in Ukraine for 90 days at once, until 23 August. Students, parents with three or more children under 18, caretakers of disabled dependents and those deemed medically unfit will not be mobilized.

From February 2022, since Russian invasion of Ukraine, first of all, reserve servicemen with combat experience who served in the Armed Forces under a contract or took part in hostilities in the Luhansk and Donetsk Oblasts of the Donbas will be mobilized first. Then, military personnel who served on conscription until 2014 will fall under mobilization. And then those who graduated from the military departments at universities and became a reserve officer, as well as other persons who do not have age and physical restrictions, will be mobilized. General mobilization was announced for a period of three months. The presidential decree was approved by the Verkhovna Rada (Ukraine's national parliament) on 3 March 2022, and in accordance with it, men aged 18 to 60 will be mobilized. Defense Minister Oleksii Reznikov said that the Ukrainian authorities plan to mobilize 1,000,000 people.

According to the law "On mobilization training and mobilization", general mobilization in Ukraine is carried out simultaneously throughout its territory and concerns the economy, state authorities, local self-government, the armed forces, and other formations, enterprises, institutions, and organizations.

On 22 June 2022, a bill was submitted to the Verkhovna Rada prohibiting men of military age from traveling abroad during martial law. It is assumed that the circle of persons to whom an exception will be made will be determined by the law "On mobilization training and mobilization."

In July 2022, the Ministry of Defense of Ukraine decided that from October in the military commissariats, all women who received education in the fields of chemistry, biology, and telecommunications will have to enter the military register. The ministry explained that all women liable for military service will not be able to travel abroad during martial law.

In August 2022, the Verkhovna Rada extended martial law and general mobilization until 21 November 2022.

In September 2022, Deputy Minister of Defense of Ukraine Anna Malyar announced the forthcoming postponement of the deadlines for registering women for military registration for the next year, she clarified that: "The Ministry of Defense, within the framework of its powers, prepared a decree that once again postponed the deadlines for admitting women of certain professions / specialties to the military accounting for another year – until 1 October 2023."

On 17 November 2022, the Verkhovna Rada adopted laws approving presidential decrees on the extension of martial law and general mobilization in Ukraine for 90 days, until 19 February 2023.

== 2023 ==
The Demographics of Ukraine limits the effectiveness of mobilizing under-35s

On 7 February, 2 May, 27 July and 8 November 2023 the Verkhovna Rada adopted laws approving presidential decrees on the extension of martial law and general mobilization in Ukraine for 90 days each. Lasting from 19 February 2023 to 20 May, to 18 August, to 15 November, to 14 February 2024.

On 19 December 2023, President Zelenskyy said that the Ministry of Defense proposed to mobilize 450,000 to 500,000 additional Ukrainian citizens, including Ukrainian men living abroad, into the Ukrainian Armed Forces. Zelenskyy said that if needed, the conscription age could be reduced from 27 to 25 years. On 26 December, the Commander-in-Chief of the Armed Forces, Valery Zaluzhny, said that the military command had not formally requested the mobilization, and while it provides ongoing classified requests for various resources, it is not entitled to propose legislative initiatives.

== 2024 ==
On 6 February and 8 May 2024, the Verkhovna Rada adopted laws approving presidential decrees on the extension of martial law and general mobilization in Ukraine for 6 months in total. Lasting from 14 February to 13 May, to 11 August 2024.

On 23 February 2024, the parliament of Ukraine passed a demobilization bill introduced by Zelenskyy. The bill stipulates that conscripts who have been mobilized since 2022 should be pulled in reserve for at least 12 months within the terms determined by the decree of the president of Ukraine. The demobilization came into effect in April and May 2024. It only targets young people who have completed their military service during martial law and have not been in reserve.

In late December 2023, due to the lack of recruits to the Armed Forces of Ukraine and at the urging of the former Commander-in-Chief of the Armed Forces of Ukraine Zaluzhnyi, a new draft bill was proposed in the parliament. The bill would, among other things, lower the conscription age from 27 to 25, set a limit to discharge conscripts after 36 months of active duty during martial law, give military recruiters and the state of Ukraine more legal pathways to restrict and punish draft evaders in Ukraine and abroad, and enable them to hand out call-up papers digitally. After initial hearing and a wave of criticism of it being unconstitutional the proposal was amended in mid-January 2024 and passed at the first hearing in the Verkhovna Rada. The final bill was expected to be adopted in March 2024, filling the gap of the 500,000 new conscripts Ukraine needs to sustain the war. At the end of March 2024, the Rada Committee on National Security, Defense, and Intelligence had reviewed 4,269 amendments. On 11 April the bill was passed in the Verkhovna Rada and on 16 April Zelenskyy signed it into law, scheduled to take effect a month after its signing on 18 May.

In late March 2024, the newly appointed Commander-in-Chief of the Armed Forces of Ukraine Oleksandr Syrsky, contrary to his predecessor Zaluzhnyi denied the need to mobilize 500 000, citing that after an audit that number had been significantly reduced. Previously, there had been an audit of the AFU forces at Syrsky initiative of a supposed gap of 700 000 soldiers in the Armed Forces of Ukraine, who the head of the Office of the President of Ukraine Mykhailo Podoliak described as to have never seen the front-line.

On 2 April 2024, Zelenskyy signed a standalone bill lowering the mobilization age from 27 to 25. The bill had already been passed in the Verkhovna Rada since May 2023. This came just a week after Syrskyi's audit.

In mid-April 2024, Zelenskyy signed a new mobilization law aimed at increasing the number of soldiers. The law requires all Ukrainian men between the ages of 18 and 60 to register with the Ukrainian military and to carry their registration documents with them at all times. The government banned the issuance of new passports and the provision of non-emergency consular services to Ukrainian men of military age abroad.

On 17 May 2024, president Zelenskyy signed a law allowing some convicts to enlist in the army for a chance at a suspended prison sentence. The legislation excludes mass-murderers, rapists, and those who committed crimes against national security from enlisting.

== 2025 ==
On 15 January, 16 April, 15 July, and 21 October 2025, the Verkhovna Rada adopted laws approving presidential decrees extending martial law and general mobilization in Ukraine for 90 days each. These extensions ran from 8 February 2025 through 9 May, through 6 August, through 5 November 2025, and ultimately until 3 February 2026, constituting the 14th through 17th extensions of martial law since the full-scale invasion began. The July extension was approved by 320 members of parliament with a single vote against. The October vote extended the period effective from 5 November 2025, with 317 members of parliament voting in favour of the martial law extension and 315 for the mobilization extension.

== 2026 ==
On 14 January and 28 April 2026, the Verkhovna Rada adopted laws approving presidential decrees extending martial law and general mobilization for 90 days each, first from 3 February until 4 May 2026 and then until 2 August 2026, representing the 18th and 19th extensions respectively since the start of the full-scale invasion. The January vote saw 330 members of parliament approve the martial law extension and 312 the mobilization extension; the April vote recorded 315 for martial law and 304 for mobilization.

In June 2026, the European Commission formally proposed extending the temporary protection framework for displaced Ukrainians until March 2028, while introducing restrictions aligned with ongoing mobilization efforts. At the request of the Ukrainian government, newly arriving Ukrainian men aged 23 to 60 subject to military obligations would be excluded from automatic EU protection status. The European Union justified the measure by stating it supported Kyiv's legitimate need to enforce military obligations for national defense.

== Draft dodging, bribes and demobilization ==
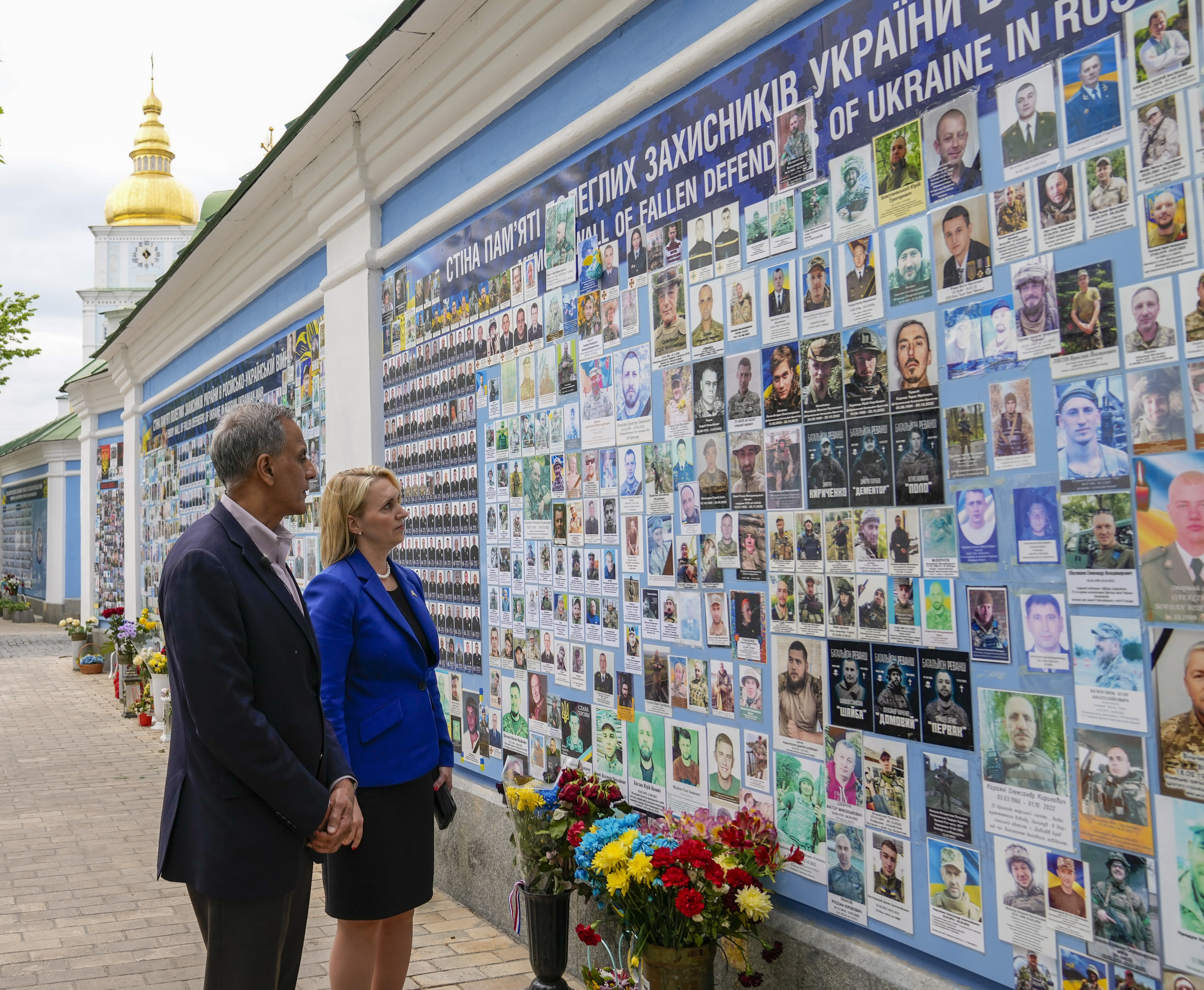
Monument to Ukrainian soldiers killed during the war. The Ukrainian military has suffered hundreds of thousands of casualties since the 2022 Russian invasion, driving the ongoing conscription crisis.

Since the Russian invasion of Ukraine in February 2022, around 650,000 military-aged men have left the country. According to Ukrainian authorities, as of November 2023, around 20,000 people had been caught while trying to cross the border illegally since February 2022, and another 20,000 successful crossings were recorded between February 2022 and 31 August 2023 according to a BBC Eye Investigation.

Following the start of the 2022 Russian invasion of Ukraine, more than 20,000 foreigners volunteered to join the Ukrainian military. However, as of February 2023, the number of foreigners in the Ukrainian military was estimated at 2,000. Several reasons for this decrease have been given: "war tourists" and "thrill seekers" were weeded out, part of the volunteers left as they did not expect fighting of such a high intensity in harsh conditions, and some of them reported situations of violent abuse and "suicide missions". In 2023, harsher methods of mobilization began to be used, such as road blocks, business raids, and pulling people from the streets. In the latter half of 2023, videos surfaced online showing Ukrainian men violently dragged into vans and driven to the military recruiting centers (TCC).

Corruption in military medical commissions was described as systematic by Ukrainian President Volodymyr Zelenskyy in 2023, with bribes being given in exchange for exemptions from service. In at least one case, a mentally disabled person was declared fit for service, and in another an epileptic man died on his first day of service after being mobilized. A number of legal cases related to lawlessness in the recruitment of new conscripts have been opened.

Ukrainian Armed Forces servicemen are reported to be some of the oldest in the world, with an average age of 43 in November 2023, 10 years older than in March 2022.

The lack of resources for mobilization also affects rotation, with many soldiers having no rotation since the start of the full-scale invasion in 2022. In October 2023, protests took place in seven Ukrainian cities, primarily consisting of wives and relatives of soldiers demanding demobilization. As part of these protests, around 100 relatives of soldiers held a demonstration in Kyiv.

On 23 April 2024, the Ukrainian foreign ministry announced that it would suspend consular services to overseas Ukrainian men who were eligible for military service, with the exception of those returning to Ukraine.

On 24 April 2024, the Ukrainian government issued a decree banning the delivery of identification documents and passports to Ukrainian men of military age abroad.

As of 26 April 2024, the Polish government has offered, and the Lithuania governments is considering, repatriating Ukrainian men living in their countries to Ukraine, so that they can be drafted into the Ukrainian military. It is a "very rough estimate" that some 300–400,000 men alone are living in Poland, but it is not clear how a forcible repatriation could be carried out in practice.

In January 2026, newly appointed Defense Minister Mykhailo Fedorov stated before parliament that nearly two million Ukrainians were officially listed as wanted for violating military registration rules, while approximately 200,000 service members were listed as absent without leave (AWOL).

== Desertion ==
In early 2023, a new law was signed into the Ukrainian Parliament which stated that desertion or "failure to appear for duty without a valid reason" would result in up to 12 years in prison. Critics of the law argued that the law punishes soldiers more harshly rather than try to deal underlying causes of desertion. According to the Prosecutor General's Office, more than 60,000 criminal cases have been opened for desertion with almost half occurring between January 2024 and September 2024. This number rose to 80,000 by October 2024 and 100,000 by the end of November 2024. It is estimated that the number of deserters could be as high as 200,000. By November 2025, Ukrainian law enforcement had opened more than 310,000 criminal cases for unauthorized absence from military units and desertion since the start of the full-scale invasion, with the vast majority of those cases filed in the first ten months of 2025 alone. In October 2025, a wartime record was set when 21,602 such cases were registered in a single month. In November 2025, the Prosecutor General's Office ceased publishing AWOL and desertion data, stating that such figures risked being used to generate misleading conclusions about the morale of Ukrainian servicemen. For Ukrainian penal battalions, if a soldier of a penal battalion attempts to desert or retreat without authorization, an additional 5 to 10 years would be added to their sentence.

== See also ==
- Busification
- Mobilization in Ukraine
- 2022 mobilization in the Donetsk People's Republic and the Luhansk People's Republic
- 2022 Russian mobilization
