= Ukrainian desertion crisis =

Russo-Ukrainian war desertion crisis

Desertion from the Armed forces of Ukraine during the Russian invasion of Ukraine has reached significant proportions. According to the Prosecutor General's Office of Ukraine, between 24 February 2022 and August 2025, there were more than 200,000 AWOL and 50,000 desertion cases opened with at least 161,461 AWOL and 21,479 desertion cases in the first 10 months of 2025 alone. Over 21,000 criminal cases related to AWOL or desertion were opened in October 2025, which was the highest in all 4 years of war.

Deutsche Welle reported, that in 2023–2024 the number of AWOL cases in the Armed Forces of Ukraine was so large, that only 7% of them were investigated.

== Legislation and legal terms ==
At the beginning of the Russian invasion of Ukraine, Volodymyr Zelenskyy signed a law on general mobilization, according to which men aged 27 to 60 were liable for mobilization into military service. In April 2024 he signed a law that lowered the minimum age to 25.

Ukrainian law distinguishes between desertion (Article 408) and unauthorized abandonment of a military unit (AWOL) (Article 407). Desertion is the unauthorized departure from a military unit or place of service with the intent to evade duty. AWOL refers to temporarily leaving the unit without the commander's permission but without the intention to evade service entirely, focusing on the act of leaving and the duration of absence. If found guilty, a deserter faces a prison sentence of 5 to 12 years. Unauthorized abandonment of a military unit (AWOL) is punishable by imprisonment for 5 to 10 years.

On August 20, 2024, the Verkhovna Rada abolished criminal liability for those who deserted for the first time, subject to the condition of returning to the ranks of the Armed Forces of Ukraine. Until the end of November 2024, a service member could change his brigade only with the consent of his commander. Under the new law, a deserter returning to service can choose a different brigade.

On November 28, 2024, Zelensky signed a law exempting Ukrainian Armed Forces soldiers who left their unit from criminal persecution if they return to their unit by January 1, 2025, while also returning all their benefits, pay, supplies, and food provisions. This option can only be used once. Upon the soldier's return, their commander must reinstate their contract within 72 hours and notify investigative authorities of their return. After this, the soldier who left their unit without authorization will be assigned to a reserve battalion, from where they will be assigned to a military unit other than the one in which they previously served. The deadline was subsequently extended until early March 2025.

According to a representative of the State Bureau of Investigation of Ukraine, the prosecutor's office and the military bring charges against deserters only when they cannot be returned to their units.

== Development of the crisis ==
The desertion in the ranks of the Ukrainian Armed Forces has exposed a number of problems in the Ukrainian army: management problems, a suboptimal mobilization campaign, fatigue of personnel and understaffing of units on the front lines.

An officer with the 72nd Mechanized Brigade of the Ukrainian Armed Forces believes desertion is one of the reasons why Ukrainian troops surrendered Vuhledar. Several weeks before the city's fall, it was defended by only three battalions: one line battalion and two rifle battalions. To protect the flanks, commanders were forced to withdraw units from these battalions. According to the officer, each of the battalions companies should consist of 120 men, but some had only 10 fighters. The reasons for the personnel shortage were combat losses and desertion. About 20% of the Ukrainian soldiers missing in action from these companies deserted. In late October 2024, hundreds of soldiers from the 123rd Separate Territorial Defense Brigade of the Ukrainian Armed Forces abandoned their positions during the defense of Vuhledar. The soldiers returned to the Mykolaiv oblast and staged a protest. Among their demands were more weapons and more training. An officer from the 123rd Brigade told the Financial Times that his unit had not had a single rotation in three years. As of early December 2024, several soldiers from the 123rd Brigade are in pretrial detention, some have returned to the front, and some are in hiding.

On January 2, 2024, the Main Intelligence Directorate of the Ministry of Defense of Ukraine opened a criminal case into mass desertion by personnel of the 155th Separate Mechanized Brigade of the Ukrainian Armed Forces. According to Ukrainian journalist Yurii Butusov, a total of 1,700 personnel deserted, 50 of whom were still undergoing training in France. Since almost all Ukrainian men of draft age are prohibited from traveling abroad, some Ukrainian servicemen desert during training abroad.

According to official Ukrainian data, 30,000 previously deserted servicemen returned to the ranks of the Ukrainian Armed Forces from December 2024 to August 2025.

On 10th of December, 2025 Prosecutor General's Office of Ukraine announced that data on criminal offenses related to military desertion will no longer be published. In particular, desertion Data "can serve to form false conclusions about the moral and psychological state of Ukrainian servicemen", the office of the Prosecutor General explained. Later Hromadske reported that General Staff of Ukraine has changed the mechanism for those soldiers, who voluntarily return from after AWOL, and now those returning will only be placed into Airborne Assault Forces or assault units.

Mykhailo Fedorov, Ukraine's Defense Minister, said in January 2026 that 200,000 Ukrainians were listed as AWOL.

== Analysis ==
One of the commanders of the Ukrainian Armed Forces' aerial reconnaissance unit told the BBC that desertion is one of the reasons for Ukrainian personnel losses. Unmotivated soldiers abandon their positions and leave, resulting in Russian troops advancing from the flanks onto positions defended by motivated fighters, who are subsequently killed. According to a senior Ukrainian official, cited by the BBC, the sharp rise in desertions in 2024 is linked to two main factors: fatigue and forced mobilization ("busification"). He notes that deserters are primarily those who were forcibly mobilized and sent to the front lines without sufficient training, or morally exhausted soldiers who have been at the front since 2022. The lack of rotations, vacations, and a clearly defined end date for service exacerbates the situation.

In 2023 and 2024, the number of cases of leaving the place of service in the Armed Forces of Ukraine was so large that investigators were able to investigate only 7% of cases.

A 2024 study by the United States Army War College found, that "many Ukrainian servicemen experience mental breakdowns due to combat, leading to symptoms like PTSD, stress, anxiety, and depression. This is caused by factors including relentless exposure to violence, lack of rest, difficulty distinguishing friend from foe, and witnessing traumatic events. The ongoing conflict, insufficient mental health support, and a cultural stigma around mental health issues further complicate the situation." Similar findings appear in a BBC report.

The rise in desertions substantially aggravates Ukraine's performance on the battlefield. The Ukrainian desertion and Russia's advantage in military manpower has, beginning in 2024, allowed it to increase the pace of territorial advances.
