= Ukrainian conscription crisis =

Russo-Ukraine war manpower political crisis

Mobilization to the Armed Forces of Ukraine to combat the Russian invasion of Ukraine has resulted in a conscription crisis in the country. Among these include efforts from Ukrainian citizens to dodge draft orders and hide or escape the country, legislation to penalize draft evaders and require Ukrainian citizens to register information to streamline draft processes, and the employment of Territorial Recruitment Office (TCC) soldiers to enroll Ukrainians into training with efforts from citizens to resist. There have been cases of forced conscription, sometimes referred to as busification.

The need to maintain enough troops to fight on the frontline in Ukraine to prevent Russia from advancing and jeopardizing Ukrainian sovereignty while adhering to democratic principles and human rights created a difficult policy balance that resulted in strong internal politicization and controversy.

== Troop shortage ==
After initial attempts to seize Kyiv failed at the beginning of Russia's invasion of Ukraine, the Russian Armed Forces began to implement more attritional tactics towards the war, making use of their numerical advantage in mobilized soldiers, weapons, and military equipment. These included using infantry groups as “human waves” to riskily advance on enemy positions with the goal of entrenching deeper, often with a high casualty count per engagement. As a result, despite keeping several positions on the frontline stable for months, different AFU sections began to lose ground due to inflicted casualties preventing further reinforcements from backing up weakened positions. Casualties and a lack of reinforcements also contributed to greater fatigue and decreased morale from several units operating at the frontline for several months consecutively without being able to rotate out.

The 2024 Kharkiv offensive beginning in May further stretched out the frontline in an attempt to increase the likelihood of military breakthroughs, forcing several Ukrainian brigades to be diverted from their positions in the Donbas to the Kharkiv border region. In response, the Ukrainian generals also reassigned soldiers from rear positions to combat roles. Military analyst Michael Kofman predicted that Ukraine's manpower shortage would take months to address even with changes in mobilization laws, and that new Western artillery and long-range weapon shipments taking only weeks to arrive would not alone be able to help the UAF retake occupied territories.

93rd Separate Mechanized Brigade commander Pavlo Palisa stated that the manpower shortage was far more significant than ammo shortage, and that one soldier often has to do the work of three or four as a result. He reported that manpower shortages debilitated not only frontline units, but also fire support and security units, forcing soldiers to do their work and decreasing their overall efficiency. He reported that his brigade was outnumbered five to seven times by Russian opponents while another brigade was outnumbered ten-to-one, and that as a result, Russian forces could afford to go on the offensive once a week and lose several combat vehicles and dozens of troops each attempt. He also reported that the decreased manpower led to more experienced soldiers dying, making it more difficult to pass war experience onto new conscripts. He noted that additional troops would allow for more frequent rotations and to restore combat capabilities of units quicker, reducing their time on the frontline. This in turn would allow troops to rest and be with their families, increasing psychological and physical health as well as motivation and morale. It would also allow commanders more time to train and implement combat plans, increasing efficiency of military units.

8.7 million men of conscription age were in Ukraine prior to the February 2022 Russian invasion of Ukraine, which dwindled to roughly 5 million by February 2024 due to death and emigration. In June 2024, The Center for European Policy Analysis estimated that Ukraine's army would need 400,000 to 500,000 more soldiers to resist Russian offensives due to their much larger population giving them a greater advantage in size and speed of mobilization. Head of Ukrainian military intelligence General Kyrylo Budanov reported on 14 May that he had used all the reserve units he had available. While 35% of surveyed Ukrainian men not in the army stated they were willing to serve, factors that influenced their decision not to enroll included a shortage of materials and equipment, improper training, risk of death or injury, uncertainty about when and how demobilization would occur, and fear of incompetent officers and leadership.

In January 2026, Digital Transformation Minister Mykhailo Fedorov stated that 2 million Ukrainians were sought by authorities for military registration violations.

In June 2026, European Commission President Ursula von der Leyen signaled plans to alter the terms of the Temporary Protection Directive, an EU emergency mechanism that grants immediate collective protection to displaced persons, in response to the ongoing Ukrainian conscription crisis. Consequently, EU member states began debating whether to exclude newly arriving Ukrainian men aged 23 to 60 who were subject to mobilization requirements, arguing that continued protection could undermine Ukraine's self-defence capacity. The proposal was broadly consistent with statements made by German Chancellor Friedrich Merz, who stated during a bilateral meeting with Ukrainian President Zelenskyy that Berlin would actively support Kyiv's efforts to limit the exodus of military-age men and facilitate their return, emphasizing their importance for Ukraine's defense and future reconstruction. Furthermore, representatives from Poland, Finland, Sweden, and Austria also voiced support for the proposal during EU ministerial meetings, arguing that restricting automatic residency rights for draft-age men is necessary to maintain Ukraine's military capacity and support its war effort.

== Legislation ==
=== Bill 10378 ===
In April 2024, the Verkhovna Rada passed a mobilization bill (Bill No. 10378) for the "improvement of mobilization, military registration, and military service", and to clarify actions against and penalties towards draft dodgers, after months of deliberation over drafted 4,000 amendments. Representative Fedir Venislavskyi stated that the law's primary goal was to record all conscripts and their data in order to determine who can be mobilized and who can postpone the draft. The law was originally submitted on 25 December 2023. Parliamentary leader David Arakhamia stated that while lawmakers would do their best to accommodate the needs of military command, many of their provisions "directly violate[d] human rights" while others were not "optimally formulated". Objections from the parliament's Anti-Corruption Policy Committee and the Servant of the People party caused the bill to undergo several more months of amendments. Many lawmakers criticized the disorganization of discussions surrounding the bill.

David Arakhamia denounced the bill's proposal to impose the blocking of draft dodgers' bank accounts and a proposal to remove the right to defer military service to post-graduate students without state funding. Other areas that required extensive debate included whether to withdraw consular services to unregistered conscription-aged Ukrainian men taking refuge outside of Ukraine, and whether to put restrictions on driving and on holding certain jobs for draft evaders.

On 11 April 2024, the final vote took place in "an almost empty hall", where only 31 of the over 4,000 amendments were added to the bill after brief discussion, all proposed by the Servant of the People party. One edit recommended by military leadership was added, removing the right to demobilization after 36 months of continuous service while stating that a future bill would decide terms for demobilization. The final bill retained consular restrictions for citizens aboard who did not register, in addition to prohibiting driving. The ruling on demobilization was contested by several lawmakers from the European Solidarity party.

=== Other legislation ===
In April 2024, President Volodymyr Zelenskyy signed Bill 9281 to amend the "On Military Duty and Military Service" section in Ukrainian law, reducing the age of mobilization from 27 to 25, a bill that was originally passed by parliament in June 2023. Calls to mobilize Ukrainian youth were promoted in October 2023 by British Defense Minister Ben Wallace. Bill 10062 was also signed, requiring men aged 25 to 60 to give their information to the electronic "Oberig" military register, including phone numbers, e-mail addresses, foreign language abilities, passport and visa information, driver's licenses, the citizen's right to own weapons, medical examination results, and details about military service. The bills signed also removed the “partially eligible” status for many disabled citizens that allowed for limited military assignments if mobilized, narrowing the categories down to “eligible” and “noneligible” and requiring disabled conscripts to undergo a repeat medical examination to determine their eligibility.

Laws signed in May 2024 held employers accountable for keeping employee information, contributing buildings, vehicles, and other property to the war effort on request, facilitating conscription, provide reports to military services, and raise awareness about military registration and compliance to employees using flyers, meetings, or one-on-one conferences. A decree banning sending passports and ID documents to Ukrainian men ages 18–60 was also passed, making it possible to receive these documents only at migration service offices in Ukraine. The decree did not apply to Ukrainians with disabilities, those helping relatives with disabilities and ill or orphaned children, or victims of "Russian aggression". Other laws signed by Zelenskyy included increases in fines for violating mobilization laws, and allowing prisoners to sign voluntary contracts for mobilization in exchange for parole, with roughly 2,750 prisoners being mobilized as a result.

=== Resignations ===
Several lawmakers requested to leave Parliament during the period of deliberation due to joining the military, taking up other government positions, or because their interests or perspectives were not considered. Olha Vasylevska-Smagliuk voted against many requests and criticized lawmakers whose claims were false or minor as being focused on profit and of using their status for their interests instead of the intended purpose of lawmakers to serve Ukraine and its citizens. She also stated that approving all the requests would leave the number of parliamentarians on the "border of constitutionality". Center for Political and Legal Reforms member Yuliya Kyrychenko expressed her worry that the decrease in the number of deputies in parliament would make reaching majorities on legislation more difficult, which would, in turn, delay critical decisions needed during wartime.

== Draft resistance ==
=== Territorial Recruitment Centers ===
Local Territorial Recruitment Center (TCC) (Ukrainian: ТЦК) officers were tasked with checking the papers of men and delivering military summons. Officers regularly faced insults and arguments with bystanders. Many draft evaders resorted to hiding in their homes or attempting to pay bribes to mobilization officers to avoid confrontations. Several social media groups containing tens of thousands of members were created to alert men to the movements of mobilization officers so they could evade confrontation.

Several viral videos appeared to show TCC officers taking men from streets and public spaces across Ukraine to be conscripted, often involuntarily and with marked resistance. One recorded instance showed a physical fight between recruitment officers and civilians that the Kharkiv TCC claimed was provoked by the citizens, leading to one officer being injured. Ukraine's Ground Forces General Oleksandr Pavlyuk claimed that the videos were taken out of context and that resulting criticism of recruitment officers supported Russian propaganda. The Ukrainian Ground Forces said that Russian psyop videos were being filmed that contained similar hallmarks of officers getting into physical confrontations with local citizens, including realistic details like Ukrainian license plates, the recording taking place in a neutral location difficult to geolocate, and being shot on poor quality cellphone recording. It was also noted that there were videos of mobilization officers being intoxicated or getting into other situations that would undermine their authority and reputation to the Ukrainian public.

On 28 March 2024, officials from the Poltava Territorial Recruitment Center filed reports to the Ministry of Foreign Affairs of 30,000 citizens who received summons and did not show up to their TCC station. The reports stated that the names listed had committed administrative offenses, and that if fines were not paid, that officials should detain them.

Kyiv conscription officer Colonel Volodymyr Novosiadlyi expressed the need for empathy and fairness towards draftees in understanding their reservations and the fears surrounding military deployment, while also asserting the need for civilians to fulfill their duties for their nation.

On 2 November 2026, clashes erupted in Petropavlivska Borshchahivka, a suburb of Kyiv, after allegations circulated on social media that dozens of men were being unlawfully detained and tortured in a building used by the National Guard of Ukraine. Some posts claimed that around 40 men were being held in the building’s basement. Authorities rejected allegations that the facility was being used as a torture site, while investigations were launched into the circumstances surrounding the servicemen’s detention and treatment. The building was being used to temporarily accommodate National Guard personnel, including newly mobilized servicemen and soldiers who had returned after leaving their units without authorization. Four servicemen required medical attention. A 14-year-old boy was present during the confrontation and entered the facility’s yard, but he had not been detained or tortured there; rather, videos showed he had joined the confrontation, climbed a tree and thrown bricks at the building before falling into the yard. Images of the boy were misrepresented to claim that the Ukrainian military was detaining and torturing minors. The clashes involved attacks on law enforcement officers and National Guard personnel, damage to vehicles, and warning shots fired into the air. Ukrainian officials said they suspected the unrest had been organized to abduct a serviceman and provoke public disorder. The allegations and the circumstances of the confrontation remained under investigation.

=== Border crossings ===
Ukraine's border service spokesman Andriy Demchenko stated that at least 30 people had died while trying to cross the Ukrainian border to escape mobilization. Reported methods for crossing the border included paying illegal traffickers, using forged documents or bribes at legal border crossings, and hiding in vehicles as stowaways. Many people were victims to dangerous rivers such as the Tisza between Ukraine and Romania, or the Dniester between Ukraine and Moldova, and mountainous regions including the Carpathian mountains.

Demchenko reported that most illegal border crossings occurred on the borders of Moldova and Romania, while the most forged documents were reported at the Polish border. At least 450 criminal trafficking groups were discovered by authorities. Many traffickers only gave instructions on the route used once they were paid, which often involved arduously swimming through a mountain river. Demchenko claimed that wild animals in the mountains were also a significant cause of death and injury.

A BBC Eye investigation reported that up to 31 August 2023, 19,740 Ukrainian men took such routes crossing into Romania, Moldova, Poland, Hungary and Slovakia to avoid mobilization, while 21,113 were caught. Of these, 14,313 men attempted to traverse rivers or mountains across the border while 6,800 tried to forge documents at border crossings, several of them paying money for forgeries. In August 2023, Volodymyr Zelenskyy condemned medical military commissions who accepted bribes ranging from $3,000 to $15,000 for exempt medical documents, leading to a ten-fold increase in exemptions compared to August 2022, and leading to at least "thousands" unlawfully fleeing the country. He accusing several commissions of corruption and "high treason". Zelenskyy responded by removing all head regional conscription officers, and opening more than 100 criminal cases following a southern Odessa region corruption scandal the prior month, with 30 people given criminal charges.

On the other hand, the Oberig electronic system made it much easier to check the authenticity of TCC documents and stop evaders who used forged documents. Many drivers who tried to cross the border were only allowed to cross if they were verifiably involved in the international transportation of goods and passengers, or humanitarian aid for Ukrainian civilians and military. The State Border Service also adjusted its formations to create brigade-type units that could carry out combat operations to guard the border, with parliament passed a law increasing its membership by 15,000 servicemen to allow more units to be created.

== Criticism ==
Mayor of Dnipro Borys Filatov criticized mobilization laws due to his city running out of civil servants and public transport workers, causing numerous issues in maintaining essential and fundamental institutions for civilians and family members of frontline troops.

Ukrainian independent journalism agency Texty criticized the legislative and authoritative methods of mobilizing more citizens as a means of avoiding organization of the mobilization process and cooperating with police in advance instead of expecting them to go after thousands of civilians at once, and cited how only police have the authority to detain people by force in Ukrainian law. The editorial stated that by having TCC officers force people into mobilization in public with minimal notice, the government violates human rights under democracies by not acting within the limits of the law.

It thus expressed that Russian anti-mobilization propaganda was able to spread so easily because of how these actions were autocratic instead of democratic in policy, and how citizens will refuse to fight if Ukraine has become "a copy of Russia". The editorial also condemned how instead of promoting positive stories of heroism and patriotism from fellow citizens fighting in the war, that official institutions instead regularly report on incidents of citizens trying to flee the country and being caught, trying to blame them for Ukraine's defeats in war. The 3rd Separate Assault Brigade constituted a positive example whose reputation as having extensive combat experience with a fearless, brave approach to battle coupled with their public recruitment campaign on social media causes them to receive over 900 volunteer requests a month.

The neologism "busification" has been coined to describe Ukrainian conscription officers' practice of checking men walking down city streets in daytime for exemption cards and forcibly detaining those who fail to immediately show such cards, and placing them on a direct bus to mobilisation centres. Author Andrey Kurkov has described it as a "humiliating term," reminiscent of the British Empire's press gangs. One area where the TCC has faced criticism for raiding is concerts and other entertainment venues, done in many large cities throughout Ukraine; conscription officers enter performances to check documents and draft statuses of attendees, or in some instances the performers themselves, causing decreased attendance or cancellation of events. In one instance in October 2024, TCC officers and the police waited outside a concert by the Ukrainian band Okean Elzy in Kyiv, detaining men who were unregistered for the draft, with some being dragged off the venue.

== See also ==
- Conscription Crisis of 1944
- Conscription Crisis of 1917
- Conscription Crisis of 1918
