= Busification =

Method of forced conscription in Ukraine

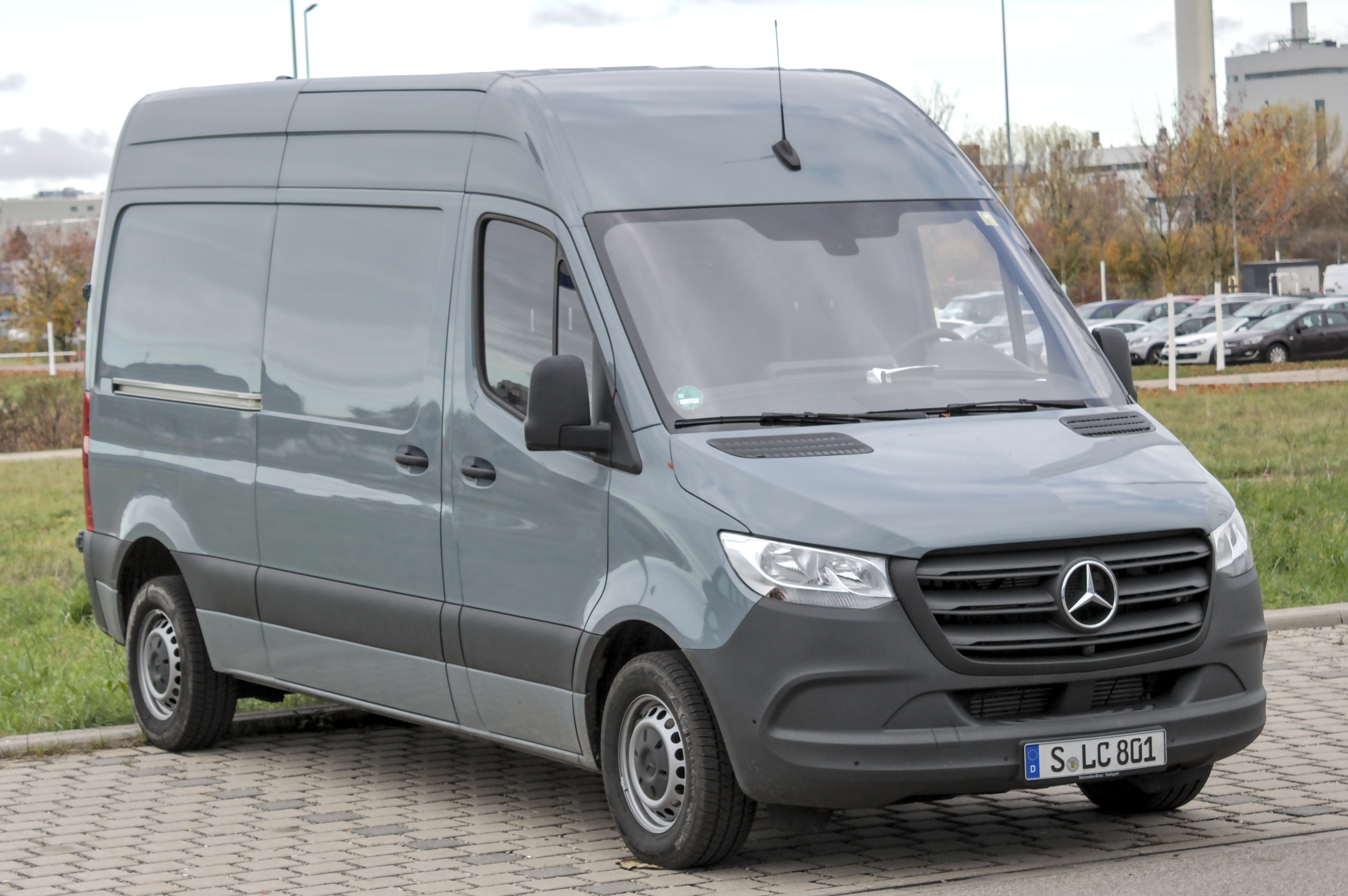
"Busik" (diminutive of English: bus) colloquially means a minibus

Busification (Ukrainian: Бусифікація, Russian: бусификация) is a term that emerged in Ukrainian society and media to describe a controversial method of forced conscription into the Armed Forces of Ukraine during the ongoing Russian invasion. The word refers to situations in which employees of territorial recruitment centers (TCC) and law enforcement officers forcibly load men of conscription age into buses.

The term is a portmanteau of "busyk" (from English: bus) — a colloquial name for minibuses or similar vehicles to apprehend used by authorities to transport detainees to TCC — and the suffixoid “-ification,” which denotes an action or transformation (from Latin "facio"). The practice is associated with physical coercion by territorial recruitment offices and has become a prominent symbol in debates over conscription, state authority, individual rights, and national mobilization policy.

== Description ==
Busification originally referred to operations by territorial recruitment and TCC in which teams of officers in civilian clothes or marked uniforms detain men on streets, marketplaces, transportation hubs, workplaces, and other public locations. Those targeted are then escorted or forced into minibuses and transported to enlistment centers for induction into military service, often without prior individual appointment or consent.

The phenomenon grew against the backdrop of Ukraine's widescale military mobilization following the Russian full-scale invasion of February 2022. Initial stages of the conflict saw significant voluntary enlistment and volunteer support efforts, but enthusiasm for voluntary service reportedly declined as the war prolonged. Critics of current conscription practices contrast "busification" with early voluntary mobilization, asserting that the former represents a shift toward compulsory recruitment with limited individual choice. TCC operations are legally grounded in Ukraine's mobilization laws, which grant authorities the power to call up eligible citizens; however, the specific tactics and public perception of busification remain subjects of intense controversy and debate. Public polls indicate widespread support for Ukraine's armed forces while expressing lower confidence in the mechanisms of conscription and recruitment administration.

Busification is part of a broader discourse on conscription policy in Ukraine as the country continues to manage manpower shortages, sustain military operations, and balance compulsory service with recruitment needs. Public opinion surveys and media reports indicate dissatisfaction with conscription mechanisms, including busification, even among segments of the population that support defending Ukraine against external aggression. Some analysts emphasize that the phenomenon reflects deeper social divisions and evolving attitudes toward state obligations during wartime.

== Methods ==
Busification in Kyiv

Reports describing busification typically involve:

- Detention of men in public spaces such as streets, markets, public transport stops, or workplaces;
- Transportation of detainees in vans or minibuses to recruitment centers;
- Limited opportunity for individuals to verify exemptions, deferments, or medical eligibility prior to transport.

Video recordings of such incidents, widely circulated on social media, show confrontations between recruitment officers, detainees, and bystanders. In some cases, crowds have intervened to block vehicles or physically prevent detentions.

Critics have likened the visible police-style operations to aggressive enforcement practices and public manhunts. However, Ukrainian defense authorities maintain that physical force is only applied when an individual legally liable for service resists or attempts to evade enlistment. The frequency, conduct, and legality of such operations remain contested topics within Ukraine.

== Incidents ==
Reports of busification include scenes of minibuses confronting and detaining individuals in open spaces, sometimes accompanied by resistance, confrontation with bystanders, and physical struggle. In some documented cases, groups of civilians have intervened to prevent detentions, including overturning vehicles used in busification operations and aiding targets of recruitment teams to escape. Social media platforms and mobile phone recordings have played a significant role in disseminating footage of such incidents, contributing to the term's prominence in public discourse.

One of the most prominent cases involved Roman Sopin, a 43-year-old resident of Kyiv. In October 2025, Sopin was detained by personnel from a territorial recruitment center and taken to a mobilization facility. He was later transferred to a hospital with severe head injuries and died shortly afterward. Medical findings reportedly indicated significant blunt trauma to the head, while officials suggested he may have collapsed and struck his head during the incident. The case drew public attention and became one of the most widely discussed controversies surrounding forced recruitment practices.

Another widely publicized episode concerned József Sebestyén, a Ukrainian dual citizen of Hungarian origin who died in 2025 after being mobilized. Allegations circulated that he had been beaten after his recruitment, although Ukrainian authorities rejected that interpretation and disputed claims of abuse.

Responsible Statecraft provides additional examples of deaths occurring during or shortly after forced recruitment operations. In one case, a 36-year-old man reportedly died shortly after being taken to a recruitment center in the city of Rivne. In another incident, a mobilized individual died after jumping from a moving vehicle that was transporting him to a recruitment facility.

Defense editor Jerome Starkey of the British newspaper The Sun wrote that during a trip to the Ukrainian front line, his Ukrainian colleague who was working as a translator was forcibly taken by armed recruiters and effectively pressed into military service.

Other episodes include the detention of a schoolteacher in Kyiv who was reportedly taken directly from his classroom during a mobilization raid, as well as public confrontations between recruitment officers and civilians. In some cases, bystanders attempted to intervene. One widely circulated example described residents in Odesa overturning a recruitment vehicle in an attempt to free detained men, while another report mentioned an attack on a recruitment office aimed at releasing individuals who had already been taken there.

== Reactions ==
According to TSN, in the first nine months of 2024, the Ukrainian Human Rights Commissioner Dmytro Lubinets received more than 1,500 complaints from Ukrainians about violations of their rights by TCC employees.

According to Solomiya Bobrovska, a member of the Ukrainian parliament from the Holos party and the Parliamentary Committee on National Security, Defense and Intelligence, the issue of "busification", which was particularly acute in the Zakarpattia, Odesa, and Chernivtsi regions where it became a systemic phenomenon, prompted parliament in May 2024 to reach an agreement with the General Staff and the Ministry of Defense. Under this agreement, the powers and duties of local authorities were expanded in exchange for discontinuing the use of force during mobilization. According to the MP, the military authorities violated the agreement, and only isolated cases of punishment for TCC and Joint Support Center officials are known. Ukrainian MP Yehor Cherniev confirmed the existence of such an agreement. In early December 2024, he stated that the relevant parliamentary committee had repeatedly summoned Ministry of Defense representatives due to ongoing cases of "busification".

According to Ivan Timochko, Chairman of the Council of Reservists of the Ground Forces of the Armed Forces of Ukraine, "busification" generally targeted "draft evaders" and individuals on the wanted list. However, he said, "the issue was amplified in the media and among politicians for the sake of their ratings".

International news outlets have noted similar controversial recruitment practices in Ukraine's wartime context, describing instances where men are abruptly detained and transported by recruiters, and highlighting the resulting public pushback and legal concerns. These reports situate busification within broader global conversations on conscription, civil liberties, and wartime governance.

In November 2024, Ukraine's Minister of Defense Rustem Umerov publicly stated that authorities intended to end the practice of busification and modernize recruitment through incentives and digitalization. However, Responsible Statecraft reports that evidence of meaningful reform remained limited, and reports of forced recruitment continued into 2025.

On 8 July 2025, the Council of Europe’s Commissioner for Human Rights published a report which said there were systemic human rights violations during mobilization, which included reports of beatings, selective recruitment, and the conscription of people with disabilities.

At the end of January 2026, president of Ukraine Volodymyr Zelenskyy acknowledged the problem of "busification" and instructed Defence Minister Mykhailo Fedorov to deal with the issue.

== Assessments ==
According to former Lviv City Council deputy and military serviceman Ihor Sholtis, in wartime the state must exercise its monopoly on the use of force and involve people in the army when they refuse to do so voluntarily. At the same time, he notes the negative effect of increasing the number of unmotivated individuals in Ukraine's defense forces.

According to former MP and serviceman Ihor Lutsenko, "busification" should not be confused with compulsory mobilization, which has existed in all countries during total wars. Compulsory mobilization implies that the state targets qualified specialists in certain fields, and that those called up appear by summons for the mobilization and training process. However, when servicemen randomly seize conscripts from the streets, it indicates the absence of a mobilization plan and that officials are acting merely for reporting purposes.

The Center for Strategic Communications and Information Security, a Ukrainian government organization, links the spread of the term to efforts by Russian propaganda to amplify anti‑mobilization rhetoric and discredit TCC as an institution.

Responsible Statecraft notes that busification has received limited coverage in major Western media outlets, despite extensive reporting within Ukraine. The article argues that coercive recruitment practices are largely absent from mainstream Western narratives on the war, which tend to focus on battlefield developments and diplomatic issues. This disparity in coverage has contributed to differing international perceptions of Ukraine's mobilization policies.

The expansion of busification has been linked by analysts to broader manpower challenges facing the Ukrainian military. Responsible Statecraft cites reports of rising desertion rates and disciplinary cases within the armed forces, suggesting that retention difficulties may be contributing to increasingly coercive recruitment methods.

According to polling data cited by Responsible Statecraft, support for a negotiated end to the war increased between 2023 and 2025, while backing for fighting until total victory declined. In this context, forced mobilization practices have become more politically sensitive and socially contested.

== Cultural influence ==
Ukrainian writer Andriy Kurkov draws attention to the growing popularity of this "humiliating term", noting that it has even been used in the Verkhovna Rada. He finds its usage offensive both to the military and to those mobilized, drawing parallels with the Victorian-era British recruitment brigades (English: press gangs) that forcibly took men to serve in the navy.

The term "busification" was recognized as Ukraine's word of the year for 2024 by the Myslovo dictionary of neologisms.

== See also ==
- Ukrainian conscription crisis
- Ukrainian desertion crisis
- Shanghaiing – Kidnapping people to serve as sailors
- Impressment – Forced conscription with violence
