= Centre for Strategic Communication and Information Security =

Ukrainian governmental fact-checking organisation

The Centre for Strategic Communication and Information Security (CSCIS) (Ukrainian: Центр стратегічних комунікацій та інформаційної безпеки) is a government organization established under the Ministry of Culture and Information Policy of Ukraine in March 2021 as one of the mechanism to build the national resilience, fight against information threats and disinformation together with relevant public institutions, civil society organizations, and international partners. The editorial team of the CSCIS is a structural unit within the Ukrainian national news agency Ukrinform.

After the start of the full-scale Russia invasion into Ukraine, the centre has become one of the leading channels of government communication about the war in Ukraine.

== History ==
The Centre for Strategic Communication and Information Security was established on March 31, 2021. Its first chair was Liubov Tsybulska. Since September 6, 2021, the centre has been headed by Ihor Solovey. The deputy chair of the centre is Mykola Balaban.

In December 2021, the Centre for Strategic Communication and Information Security organized the first forum of strategic communications in Ukraine, Kyiv Stratcom Forum. It brought together 32 Ukrainian and international experts, who attended panel discussions and discussed ways of cooperation between the government and civil society in order to form national resilience to information threats and disinformation.

== Mission and purpose ==
The mission is to ensure the integrity of the information environment, raising awareness of Ukrainians about information threats, strengthening the capacity of civil society and people's resilience.

The purpose is to build sustainable government communications to counteract disinformation and to form the resilience of Ukrainian society to disinformation. Today, the Centre for Strategic Communication acts as a bridge between the government, civil society, and other Ukrainians, and is designed to foster a sustained response to disinformation at the level of society as a whole.

== Main tasks ==
- Analysis of the information environment, monitoring of disinformation narratives, as well as research of vulnerable audiences;
- Raising society's awareness about information threats through creation of explainers, organizing press conferences, and engaging media and partners in joint work;
- Supporting government public communications by developing the communication skills of civil servants and improving the rapid response communication system;
- Increasing the resilience of civil servants to disinformation and information attacks;
- Participation in the development of a strategic communications system; organization and coordination of activities for its development;
- Strengthening the resilience of vulnerable audiences in Ukraine to disinformation through targeted awareness campaigns and educational activities;
- Establishing cooperation between the state and civil society institutions to build resilience to disinformation and hybrid threats;
- Organization of, and participation in, information and educational events to increase Ukrainians’ media literacy.

== Vectors of work ==
- Development of strategic communications, including the development of counter-narratives to Russian narratives; conducting information campaigns; including Ukrainian narratives in the daily communication of the Government.
- Cooperation with civil society and strengthening its voice.
- Rapid-response communication and informing the public about the most important news and events on social media and platforms: Facebook, Telegram, Instagram, Twitter, Viber and YouTube.
- Joint development of step-by-step guidelines in various situations during the war in the form of accessible reference materials, together with public institutions and experts.
- Regular dissemination of information about Russia's hybrid aggression at the international level, joint development of mechanisms for strategic communication and countering disinformation together with international partners.

== Information products ==
On June 23, 2021, Ukrinform hosted a presentation of the brochure "In Case of Emergency or War." The centre had developed this brochure in cooperation with the State Emergency Service of Ukraine, the Ministry of Defence of Ukraine, the Office of the Commander-in-Chief of the Armed Forces of Ukraine and civil society organizations.

The brochure was published in PDF format with 28 pages in three languages: Ukrainian, English, and Russian.

The first circulation included 100,000 copies and was disseminated on frontline territories and in the regions of south and east of Ukraine with the support of the Armed Forces of Ukraine.

On February 23, 2022, the centre launched an updated and supplemented online version of the brochure, this time with 36 pages. The handbook was later followed up by the website dovidka.info Since the beginning of the full-scale war, the site and directory have been constantly expanded and supplemented with relevant information.

The project also contains two chatbots, Security: Directory in Telegram and Viber. In the first two months of their existence, more than 160,000 users subscribed to the chatbots.

The project is constantly evolving in line with the challenges facing Ukrainian society today. The main task of the Dovidka.info project is to promptly provide people with verified and high-quality information that can save lives and help overcome a difficult situation.
