= Conscription crisis =

Public dispute about a policy of conscription

A conscription crisis is a public dispute about a policy of conscription, or mandatory service in the military, known in US English as a "draft". A dispute can become a crisis when submission to military service becomes highly controversial and popular revolt ensues. From the point of view of military officials, the crisis is one of supply; where they may claim to lack enough troops to accomplish a military objective, and have, to some degree, lost control of their political ability to enforce existing conscription law.

When conscripted soldiers are sent to foreign wars that do not directly affect the security of the nation, or under pretexts and contexts that are otherwise controversial, conscription has historically been highly politically contentious within democracies.

== List ==
There were a number of conscription crises in history.

- The War in the Vendée involved an early case of a conscription crisis in 1793 as the revolutionary government sought to conscript portions of local communities for the Revolutionary Wars. Similar events occurred in Brittany.
- The New York Draft Riots of 1863 represented protests in response to President Abraham Lincoln's Enrollment Act of Conscription to draft men to fight in the ongoing Civil War.
- The Tragic Week of 1909 was a series of confrontations between the Spanish army and the working classes of in the Spanish region of Catalonia, caused by the calling-up of reserve troops to be sent as reinforcements to the Second Rif War in Morocco.
- The Conscription Crisis of 1917 was a political and military crisis in Canada during World War I.
- In the Conscription Crisis of 1918, the United Kingdom of Great Britain and Ireland government legislated for power to extend conscription to Ireland, leading to increased support for Irish nationalism. No steps were ever taken to exercise the power to conscript in Ireland.
- Other conscription crises during World War I happened in Newfoundland, Australia and New Zealand.
- The Conscription Crisis of 1944 was a political and military crisis in Canada during World War II.
- Protests against the Vietnam War in the late 1960s and early 1970s to a large degree dealt with the issue of conscription, particularly in the United States and Australia which conscripted troops for the war (other countries, like New Zealand, did not send conscripts). Decades later, the then-popular book "IV-F" that centered on easily faked ways to be held medically unqualified for military service without any real incapacitation remains in college libraries as a reminder of how systemic resistance to the draft then was. It ended in 1972, when President Nixon ended conscription and pardoned contentious objectors as a response to the crisis.
- The insubordinate movement in Spain. Since the Spanish Civil War, Jehovah's Witnesses refused to be drafted, facing death penalty in 1937. The first non-religious conscientious objector was imprisoned in 1971, starting mass civil disobedience which peaked in the mid-1980s and 1990s with hundreds of objectors jailed, until conscription was ruled out in 2001.
- The Ukrainian conscription crisis during the Russian invasion of Ukraine
