= Conscription of disabled people during the Russo-Ukrainian war =

During the Russo-Ukrainian war, numerous people with disabilities have been conscripted into the Armed Forces of both Russia and Ukraine.

== Ukraine ==
In late 2023, the Ukrainian Defence Ministry amended the criteria for medical exemptions by reclassifying people with tuberculosis, viral hepatitis, thyroid disease and HIV to be fit for military service.

On 22 October 2024, Ukrainian president Volodymyr Zelenskyy signed a decree which dissolved the medical examination commissions for determining the severity of disabilities that qualified for military exemptions.

According to an unnamed Ukrainian brigade commander who spoke to Deutsche Welle on condition of anonymity, some people who had been drafted showed up to the training center with edentulism and tuberculosis. According to a soldier who identified himself as "Kyrylo" to Deutsche Welle, he saw homeless people with swollen legs, drug addicts and alcoholics being drafted. "Kyrylo" also told DW that the medical exam is "often just a formality and in some places, it doesn't even happen" though he also mentioned that a "more thorough medical examination" would be carried out at a training center. According to another soldier who identified himself as "Oleksandr", he saw people with epilepsy and schizophrenia being drafted. "Oleksandr" also reported that in 2024, a man with schizophrenia was assigned to a brigade in the Ukrainian Marine Corps and was later identified as having schizophrenia during basic training.

In July 2025, a 28 year old man from Central Ukraine who identified himself as "Vasyl" was drafted into the Ukrainian military despite suffering from memory lapses, mental disorientation, confusion about numbers and colors, and a personality disorder which he has been receiving psychiatric care for since 2015.

On 6 January 2026, Zsolt Rebán, a Hungarian-Ukrainian man with dual citizenship was grabbed by conscription officers while walking home for lunch. Zsolt had suffered from a heart disease since childhood and was declared militarily unfit after being examined in Uzhhorod and Berehove. According to his mother, she tried to tell the conscription officers that Zsolt had been exempt from military service but they didn't listen. Zsolt was later died after collapsing outside of a training center in Lviv on 18 January 2026.

=== Reactions ===
8 July 2025, the Council of Europe’s Commissioner for Human Rights published a report which said there were systemic human rights violations during mobilization, which included reports of beatings, selective recruitment, and the conscription of people with disabilities.

== Russia ==
In September 2022, after the announcement of the 2022 Russian mobilization, a 43 year old man with an unspecified disability living in Nizhny Novgorod Oblast was sent to conscription collection point after receiving a draft notice. After it was found that he had a disability, the man was sent home.

On 25 September 2022, a 40 year old man from an Adyghe village by the name of Mikhail Timoshenko was given a draft notice by two Russian officers. Timoshenko is a veteran of the Second Chechen War who has been wheelchair bound since an injury in Grozny in 2009 and also suffers from shell shock. According to Timoshenko, the officers demanded him to appear at the military registration and enlistment office in Adygeysk despite seeing that he was in a wheelchair. The next day, Timoshenko showed up at the military registration and enlistment office where employees apologized to him and crossed his name off of the list.

On 10 January 2023, Suspilne News journalist Alexander Papin, citing a report from the Ukrainian General Staff reported that Russia had forcibly recruited up to 30 people during a raid in Horlivka, Donetsk Oblast. Of the roughly 30 people who were forcibly recruited, 4 were reported to have disabilities. According to an officer from the Ukrainian General Staff, they were sent into a Russian occupation unit after only two days of training at the Vostochny training ground.

In 2025, a Ukrainian commander, who spoke on the condition of anonymity, told The Telegraph that senior Ukrainian officials were aware of at least two confirmed cases in which mentally disabled Russians were sent to the front line in addition to two detailed by the USCC and the one purported case. One of these was Semyon Karmanov, a 27 year old man an intellectual and behavioural disability who was killed on the front line after suffering a head wound. The other was named Alexey Vachrushev, a 22 year old man who suffered spent much of his life under psychiatric care and was educated at a specialised school for children with developmental disabilities. He was drafted into the 4th Separate Motor Rifle Brigade, a former unit of the Luhansk People's Militia. A few days later, Vachrushev went missing near Horlivka. Later, his mother, Galina Vachrushev, found an undated image of him tied to a tree for refusing to fight.
