= Territorial Center of Recruitment and Social Support =

Ukrainian institution for conscription and military records

Arm badge of the Kyiv City Territorial Center of Recruitment and Social Support

The Territorial Center of Recruitment and Social Support (TCR and SS, TCR or TCK) (Ukrainian: Територіальний центр комплектування та соціальної підтримки, ТЦК та СП or ТЦК) is Ukraine's military administration body that keeps military records and mobilizes the population. Starting from 2022, the TCR and SS have completely replaced Ukraine's former system of military commissariats.

== Description ==
According to Ukrainian resolution "On the approval of the Regulation on territorial centers of recruitment and social support", local TCRs are formed, liquidated, & reorganized by the Ministry of Defense of Ukraine. The direct management of the TCR and control over their activities is carried out by the relevant operational commands, and the general command of the Ukrainian Ground Forces, which coordinates the main issues of the TCR's activities with their relevant structural subdivisions of the General staff of the Armed Forces and the Ministry of Defense. Territorial centers of recruitment and social support of the Autonomous Republic of Crimea, Kyiv, Sevastopol, and Ukrainian oblasts are legal entities under public law, with each having independent balance sheets registration accounts in the Treasury authorities.

To ensure the fulfillment of the tasks and specified functions of each TCR, structural subdivisions (departments, branches, groups, services) are formed within them. Each TCR conducts activities in accordance to the provisions with each structural division, which is approved the head of the district territorial center of recruitment and social support. Regulations on district territorial centers of staffing and social support are approved by the heads of their respective TCR.

The TCR is tasked with managing the conscription and military service of citizens, engaging in mobilization training of employees for mobilization civilians, managing military records of conscripts and reservists on the territory of the relevant administrative-territorial unit, the selection of candidates for contract military service, with participation in the selection of citizens for military reserve service, the preparation and mobilization of human and transport resources, ensuring the organization of social and legal protection of conscripts to the Armed Forces, managing veterans of military service and pensioners from among military personnel and members of their families, and participation in military and patriotic education. The personnel of the TCR, as well as the transport and material and technical means of the said TCR are maintained under the budget of the Ministry of Defense of Ukraine.

The number of TCR staff as of 2023 reached over 200, and were distributed among four operational commands: "North", "South", "West", and "East". However, some of them have separate territorial subdivisions— so-called "departments"— together with which the territorial total number of such formations approaches or exceeds 300.

== History ==
On July 19, 2017, the Government of Ukraine issued an order to approve a pilot project proposed by the Ministry of Defense of Ukraine on the formation of the TCR from August 1 to December 31, 2017, on the basis of the Chernihiv Regional Military Commissariat (now the Chernihiv Regional TCR and SS). On August 2, 2017, it was announced that starting from August 1, 2017, this pilot project was implemented not only in Chernihiv, but also in Kozelets of the Chernihiv region. The Kozelka District Military Commissariat (now the Second Branch of the Chernihiv RTCR and SS) also joined. On November 1, 2017, at a briefing attended by experts from the Department of Defense Cooperation of the US Embassy in Ukraine, an Armed Forces of Ukraine (AFU) representative publicized information about the results of reforming military commissariats in the TCR in these two military commissariats of the Chernihiv region.

On January 12, 2018, plans were announced to implement the program in Volyn by March 2018. On March 22, 2018, plans to expand the project to four more regions were announced. On April 25, 2018, information about the minister of defense of Ukraine's approval of a plan to create a TCR on the basis of military commissariats without any territorial restrictions, thus on the entire territory of Ukraine, was revealed. As of September 17, 2018, this plan provided for the reform of 111 military commissariats in the TCR in Chernihiv, Rivne, Dnipropetrovsk, and Odesa regions by the end of 2018, after which they would be implemented in all other regions of Ukraine.

On May 28, 2020, a draft law was registered in the Verkhovna Rada of Ukraine regarding, in particular, the renaming of the Military Committees of Ukraine to the TCR, but the process of its consideration was significantly delayed. On November 1, 2020, the Ministry of Defense unilaterally renamed all military commissariats of Ukraine into territorial centers, thus creating a precedent for their further functioning outside the legal field of Ukraine. They also permanently removed the term "military commissariat" from the names of structures subordinate to it throughout the territory of Ukraine. On March 30, 2021, on the basis of the above-mentioned draft law, the Verkhovna Rada of Ukraine adopted a corresponding law that signed by the president of Ukraine in April 2021, which was subsequently entered into legal force. Despite this, apart from cosmetic changes in the name, he did not change anything at all in the functioning of the former military commissariats, which negatively affected the image of the entire reform. Criticisms were levied against how the move left such factors as the paper record of conscripted citizens and conscripts in addition to maintaining a unified state register of conscripts, that until now for the newly named territorial centers of support and social protection was considered an additional option in functioning, and not vice versa.

On February 23, 2022, the TCR completely replaced the former system of military commissariats and replaced all paper records of persons with electronic records based on the "unified state register of conscripts, conscripts and reservists" already present at the legislative level.

=== Russian invasion of Ukraine ===
On August 17, 2023, President of Ukraine Volodomyr Zelenskyy approved the decision of the National Security and Defense Council of Ukraine to dismiss all heads of regional TCRs in the country in connection with corruption that had taken place numerous times before.

On July 14, 2026, law No. 15225 was passed by the Ukrainian parliament which grants convicts serving in the Ukrainian Armed Forces the same rights as other Ukrainian servicemen. One of these rights is the ability to transfer to a position within the TCR if medically unfit.

== Criticism and controversy ==
Territorial recruitment and social support centers have come under considerable criticism from the Ukrainian public and human rights activists for illegal detentions, corruption, and errors in documentation.

Criticism came from the secretary of the Defense Committee of the Verkhovna Rada, Roman Kostenko, who said there were multiple cases of defense enterprise employees and people with vision problems being forcefully mobilized. He emphasized that healthy and motivated people should be drafted into the army, and not those who managed to be "caught" by recruitment officers.

Commissioner for Human Rights Dmytro Lubinets condemned the actions of TCR employees who detained citizens or demanded documents from them in the middle of the street. He emphasized that the employees of military commissions do not have the right to such actions against civilians.

Lawyer Roman Kichka said in 2024 that for many years, the military commissariats had incorrectly drawn up documents and incorrectly referred to the requirements of the law, which led to illegal fines against citizens who had updated their data in the Reserve+ application and appeared at regional centers to clarify data.

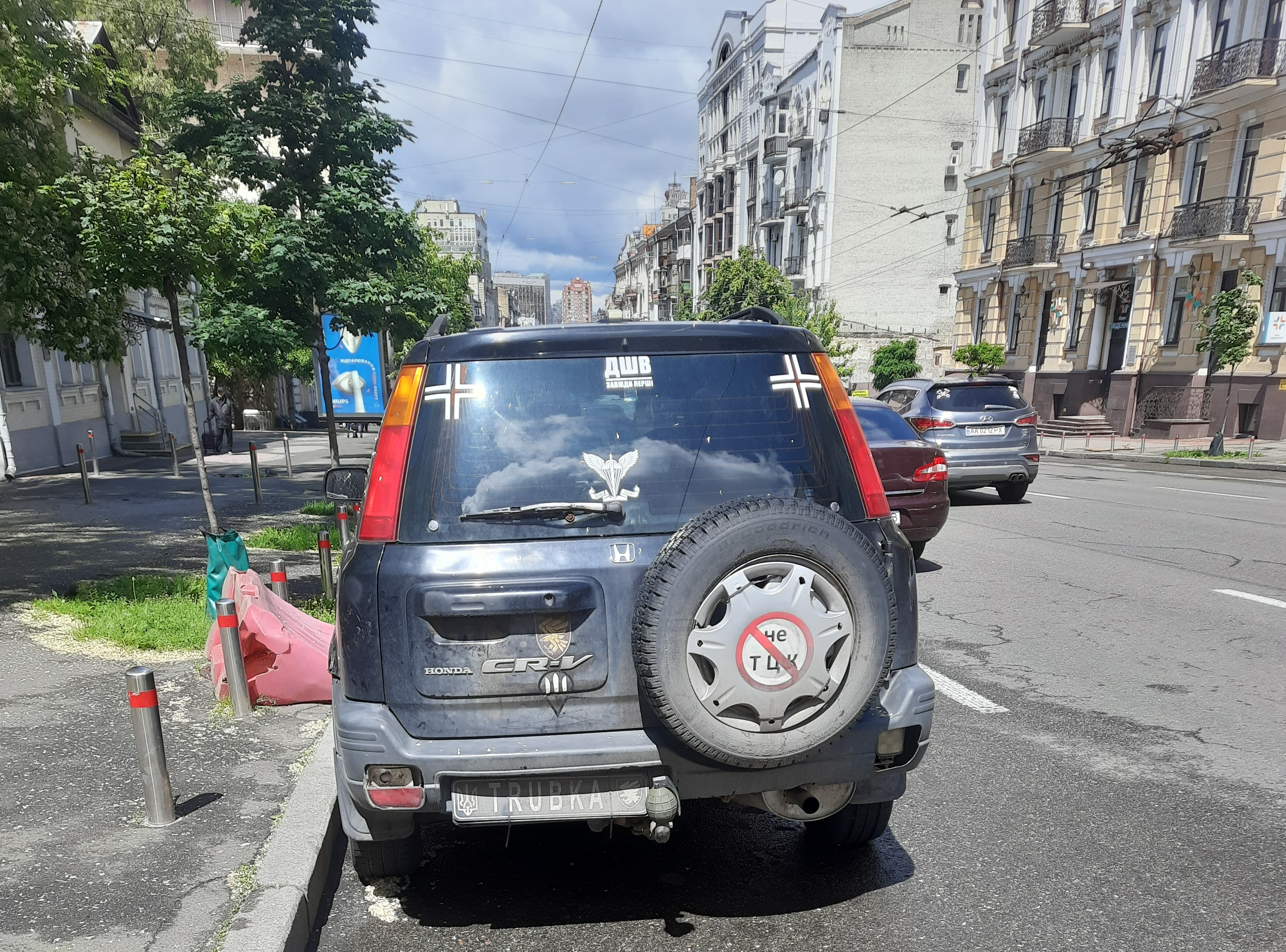
A Honda CR-V with a Balkenkreuz, belonging to the Ukrainian Air Assault Forces, parked near the Museum of Outstanding Figures of Ukrainian Culture, with the "not TCR" sign on the spare tire.

Due to regular arson attacks on TCR and SS vehicles, Ukrainian Armed Forces personnel are marking their vehicles as not belonging to this structure.

=== 2023 ===
On June 11, 2023 in Odesa, TCR employees detained a citizen who refused to provide registration documents and took him to the TCR, from where he called an ambulance. A conflict arose between ambulance workers and the TCR, which is currently being investigated under the article regarding "hooliganism" in the Criminal Code of Ukraine.

News outlets reported on Nina Tronenko's statements that her 22-year-old son was detained at the train station in Uzhhorod and forced to sign documents for referral to military training, despite the fact that he was declared unfit for military service in 2019 during peacetime. The Transcarpathian TCR confirmed that the boy passed the military medical board, and was sent to the military for training.

July 4, 2023, representatives of the TCR broke into the house of a Ukrainian "liable for military service" in the Khmelnytsky region.

=== 2024 ===
Ukrainian social media and information spaces shared several reports of conflicts between TCR employees and citizens. For example, in Baranivka, Zhytomyr Oblast, Ukrainian civilians protested against the TCR due to their involvement in the death of Serhii Kovalchuk. Kovalchuk was hospitalized with life-threatening injuries after being forcefully detained to the TCR, and later died. The TCR claimed that the man had abused alcohol, which caused him to suffer from an epileptic seizure.

December 19, 2024, near Kyiv, the TCR and police ‘smoked’ the driver out of the car with tear gas and set him on fire. December 22, 2024, according to the People's Deputy of Ukraine Artem Dmytruk, the father of a forcibly mobilized young man whom he tried to save was killed in the Odessa TCR. In general, suspicious deaths of those forcibly mobilized to the TCR are by no means isolated. A man hospitalized after being beaten died from a traumatic brain injury he suffered on December 29, 2024 at the Sumy TCR.

=== 2025 ===
January 3, 2025, in Poltava, during forced mobilization, TCR employees broke a man's leg. January 4, 2025, in Zaporizhzhia, those who were forcibly mobilized barricaded themselves in the basement of the TCR, not wanting to be sent to the training ground, and military commissars began to gas them. On January 6, 2025, as a result of a parliamentary inquiry by Olexandr Fedienko, it became known that the TCRs were ignoring the reservation of workers at critically important enterprises and were forcibly mobilizing them – while it was already becoming impossible to demobilize them. There are constant cases when TCR employees forcibly mobilize people, kidnapping them on the street, and not leaving them with the opportunity to take care of their pets. In Zaporizhzhia, a man and his dog were forcibly mobilized. In one such case, a locked cat almost died of hunger, in another, a dog being walked was left alone on the street.

Mayors of Ukrainian cities are summoned to the TCR and receive fines for disrupting plans for forced mobilization of the population. In particular, the mayors of Drohobych and Boryslav have been summoned and fined, and they intend to appeal the fines in court. According to the statement of the people's deputy of Ukraine Serhiy Yevtushok, in Rivne Oblast, TCR vehicles jam communications with electronic warfare.

On February 7, 2025, in Chernivtsi, during a military medical examination at the TCR, a man lost consciousness and died; he was only 32 years old. This is far from the only case of death on the territory of the recruitment centers.

On February 8, 2025, on the Zhitomir-Kyiv highway, near the capital, they found a beaten physics teacher from Lviv University with a fractured skull base, as it turned out, kidnapped the day before by the TCR military. Despite the fact that teachers and lecturers are not subject to mobilization by law, he was held, forced to undergo a military medical examination. So far, the Lviv Regional TCR and SS have not commented on this case. On February 13, 2025, a man forcibly delivered to the Khmelnytskyi TCR committed suicide while undergoing a military medical commission. Suicides in the premises of the TCR have happened before, for example on October 22, 2024 in Poltava. On February 13, 2025, the only son, whose father is blind and deaf, and whose mother is bedridden and blind, was forcibly mobilized because he did not have a certificate of care for his disabled parents.

On February 14, 2025, three outrageous cases of forced mobilization were recorded in the Kharkiv Oblast only: in the first video, masked TCR officers caught up with a man and used a taser on him, the man fell, after which he was dragged along the ground into a minibus; in the second video, ten police officers “pack up” one civilian; in the third video, TCR officers “packed up” a man suffering from diabetes, before which they beat him, tore his jacket, and did not even allow him to take the necessary medications, and the documents with the diagnosis that they presented were said to be "fake". On the same day in Mykolaiv, a woman approached a group of TCR employees with a bag, after which an explosion occurred, resulting in deaths and injuries. Local Telegram channels write that the woman probably took such a desperate step because of the forced mobilization of her son, who died at the front. Over five days in February 2025, attacks on the TCR occurred in the Rivne, Dnipropetrovsk and Khmelnytskyi regions.

On March 5, 2025, in Kharkiv, employees of the local army recruitment center fired a shot at a conscript running away from them, and then smashed the windows of his car. On March 20, a 65-year-old pensioner from Kaniv, returning home, was illegally (forced mobilization in Ukraine up to 60 years) detained and then beaten by employees of the TCR, as a result of which he received a number of health problems: closed craniocerebral injury, coward brain, traumatic head wound, clogged chest, injury to the cervical spine, moving arterial pressure. After leaving the hospital, contacted the police and the prosecutor's office, but both refused to hold the military commissars legally accountable. On March 24, 2025, TCC employees beat up a retired grandmother in Kyiv for her attempt to save a forcibly mobilized civilian. On March 16, 2025, in Kharkiv, TCR employees in a van deliberately hit a cyclist and then tried to forcibly mobilize him by dragging him into the van. The ombudsman Dmytro Lubinets commented on similar situations.

The commander, who had been convicted twice (for murder and bodily harm), killed a mobilized soldier, forced other soldiers to bury the body, and reported to the command that the murdered soldier had allegedly left the military unit without permission.

Pacifist and photographer died mysteriously in Kharkiv in the premises of the TCR. 39-year-old Olexiy disappeared on May 11, his family and friends searched for him for several days, but to no avail. Then, on the 13th, the police called his mother and told her that he had died on May 12. In the 20s of May, the Ground Forces of Ukraine reminded Ukrainians that those who obstruct the work of military personnel at the Territorial Center for Recruitment and Social Support could face imprisonment. As People's Deputy Yuriy Kamelchuk said on May 30, each man-catcher from the TCR must deliver a dozen mobilized people per day. On June 5, in Odessa, TCR employees beat a citizen, broke his collarbone, and still forcibly conscripted him into the AFU.

A meeting of the TCR for the Zhytomyr Oblast, held in May 2025, was posted on YouTube. Local TCR leaders from settlements within the region, communicating in a Surzhyk (mixture of Ukrainian and Russian languages), discuss the "resource supply plan" (meaning living people), which must be fulfilled by at least 60%, while "supplying" forcibly mobilized people every two hours. As "legal methods of notification", the head of the regional TCR proposes:
— calling car sales ads, thus luring citizens;
— obtaining lists of interested citizens from the police;
— removing employees from enterprises, including by influencing their managers;
— guarding students who are expelled from educational institutions, as well as students who do not have a "reservation" from mobilization;
— clarifying lists of teenagers reaching mobilization age, as well as data on their parents;
— issue mass wanted notices, including for those with "reservations", with the aim of revoking their "reservations" and forcibly mobilizing them.
At the same time, according to Article 17 of the Constitution of Ukraine: "The Armed Forces of Ukraine and other military formations (note: the TCR is part of the Ukrainian Ground Forces) cannot be used by anyone to restrict the rights and freedoms of citizens".

On May 19, in the Zhytomyr Oblast, the TCR employees detained a medical intern for 24 hours in order to draft him on his 25th birthday.

On June 4, a riot broke out among conscripts at a gathering point in Kyiv, which was suppressed by special forces. On June 19, a man who had been removed from military registration was forcibly taken to undergo a military medical examination. He fell from a third-floor window of the Krasnograd district TCR building. When his lawyer arrived, he was beaten by TCR employees, who broke his leg.

On July 18, in Kyiv, a TCR employee beat a conscript to death after several units had rejected him. After severely beating the conscript, the soldier simply left him on the parade ground, and medical personnel could only confirm his death. On July 20, in Odessa, a doctor ended up in intensive care after a conflict with military personnel at a recruiting center. On July 27, TCR employees cut off and hit a motorcyclist on the road, causing him to break his leg, and then tried to forcibly mobilize him. In general, cutting off and knocking down motorcyclists and cyclists is a common practice for military personnel at recruitment centers, often together with the police. In Mykolaiv on July 30, a man tried to escape from the TCR during a document check and jumped off a bridge and died.

On August 26, after being mobilized, a well-known breakdancer from Kropyvnytskyi died in intensive care – the TCR reports that he jumped out of a moving bus.

In the 20th of September, employees of the TCR forcibly mobilized a man who was entitled to a deferment for caring for his bedridden, ill father. On September 25, a journalist reported that schizophrenics from a psychiatric hospital in Vinnytsia were being mobilized.

On October 3, after a forced mobilization that TCR employees declared "voluntary," the truck driver ended up in intensive care. On October 6, in Cherkasy, forcibly mobilized while being transported on a bus, fell and hit his head, which caused his death. On the same day, military commissars who "mobilized" a cat in the Kyiv region returned the animal to its owners, threatening to delete video evidence of the animal's abduction. On October 24, the Kyiv police have launched a criminal investigation into the death of Roman Sopin, who was injured at the TCR distribution point.

On October 30, civilian workers of Seventh-Kilometer Market in Odesa who did not want to be forcibly conscripted put up organized resistance to the TCR raid. They turned over the "alert group" van, intended for capturing and transporting those liable for military service. In response, the commander of the 422nd Unmanned Systems Battalion "Luftwaffe" Mykola Kolesnyk, proposed to fire on civilians with strike drones and multiple launch rocket systems. And Ukrainian Armed Forces soldier Oleg Nazarenko began to make public and indecent threats: Alina Mikhailova, head of the medical service of the 1st Assault Regiment, suggested that the Security Service of Ukraine humiliate those who evade mobilization (могилизация), and that TCR employees use lethal firearms against civilians.

On November 19, 2025, in Kyselivka, while pursuing a "conscript", a man with a child was run over and killed by a car carrying Ukrainian military commissars. The man died at the scene, and the child died on the way to the hospital. On November 27, 2025, in Ivano-Frankivsk Oblast, a military commissar beat the testicles of a mobilized soldier for refusing to undergo a fluorography.

On December 24, in Rivne, a TCR employee used a pepper spray against a woman with a baby.

=== 2026 ===
On January 2, 2026, in Vyshneve, a military officer from the TCR struck a pregnant woman. On January, 7, in Zdolbuniv, a TCR employee sprayed a 15-year-old girl with a pepper spray.

Human Rights Ombudsman Dmytro Lubinets said that in January 2026, a man was hospitalized in Kyiv with fractured ribs and a chest injury; he alleged that these injuries were inflicted by police officers and representatives of the TCR and SS, and he died shortly thereafter as a result.

On February 7, in the Dnipropetrovsk Oblast, three servicemen from the TCR beat a 55-year-old man to death during forced mobilization operations. On February 27, People's Deputy Roman Kaptyelov stated that he was stopped by people in balaclavas with weapons in Dnipro.

According to the report of the Main Police Department in Dnipropetrovsk Oblast, on February 13, during the verification of military registration documents, two representatives of the RTCR and SS in the bus cabin used physical force and tear gas against the driver of the vehicle, and at the time of the incident there were other passengers in the minibus; after the incident, the RTCR servicemen left the scene.

On February 19, Oleksiy Seredyuk, commander of the “Bratstvo” battalion under the Main Intelligence Directorate of the Ukrainian Ministry of Defense, called those evading mobilization “enemies of Ukraine” and described his experience of dragging “these animals” out of their homes by their feet.

On March 3, the lawyer spoke about mobilization without a medical commission. On March 7, In Kyiv, a 140 kg man suffering from heart disease was forcibly mobilized and sent to the front to serve in an assault regiment.

On March 14, the sister of a forcibly mobilized TCR, reported the death of her brother in the “Skelya” regiment. This regiment is known for its frequent deaths shortly after the forced mobilization of civilians.

On March 30, in Lutsk, a driver of a TCR minibus struck a pregnant woman, into whose vehicle her forcibly conscripted husband had been shoved moments earlier. In May, a Ukrainian court imposed a fine of 3,400 UAH (less than $100) for the incident.

On April 2, following his forcible detention by TCR officers with the aim of compelling him to appear before a military medical board, the man fell into a coma as a result of the beatings. His military registration documents were in order, and he was not wanted as a draft dodger.

On April 3, general Kyrylo Budanov, head of the President’s Office, stated that “the army needs human capital and human resources”, adding, “so if people don’t volunteer, they will have to be mobilized”. On April 6, Ukrainian MP Oleksandr Merezhko stated that “Ukraine has enough human resources to fight for another 10 years or more”, but “the problem lies in how to get people to go to the front”.

On April 5, near Rivne, in response to a man’s refusal to exit his vehicle, military draft officers from the Territorial Recruitment Center sprayed tear gas into the car, where a pregnant woman was sitting. As a result, the man was dragged out and shoved into a minibus. During the incident, the passenger screamed that she was pregnant and couldn’t breathe, but the officers just made jokes about it. Two days earlier, at the same military registration and enlistment office, a woman from Kyiv on maternity leave with an 8-month-old child was registered and drafted into the army.

On 17 April, Kyiv Oblast Draft Center, citing information from the Ukrainian National Police, stated that at least 620 enlistment officers had been attacked between 24 February 2022 and 12 April 2026.

On April 23 in Lviv, a military vehicle from the TCR struck the mother of a recently mobilized young man; they dragged her to the gate and took her son away, leaving the woman with broken legs.

On April 23, the State Bureau of Investigation announced that two military personnel from the Kyiv Territorial Recruitment Center would stand trial for actions and inaction that led to the death of a conscript during his transport to the capital.

On April 25, a man who had been forcibly mobilized died at the TCR in Kryvyi Rih.

On May 8, in Volhynia, the TCR attempted to mobilize the Metropolitan Włodzimierz (Melnyk) of the Ukrainian Orthodox Church.

On May 11, a man who had been forcibly conscripted died while undergoing a military medical examination.

On May 11, Metropolitan Longin (Jar) stated that his son had been beaten all night at the TCR with bottles filled with water and sand. He also reported that TCR staff forced one of the priests from Bukovina to dig a two-meter-deep pit, pushed him into it, filled the pit with water, and kept him there until morning. And those unwilling to sign a contract with the Armed Forces of Ukraine to be sent to the front have needles driven under their fingernails.

On May 15, MP Yuriy Kamelchuk revealed information about the murder of a father of five children at the TCR, which was staged to look like an accident: he was pushed against a wall and his fall was captured on video.

On May 26, the Shepetivka City District Court in Khmelnytskyi Oblast handed down a verdict in the case of the death of a conscript who was beaten to death in the barracks by a TCR employee.

On May 27, it was reported that a TCR official in the Volyn Oblast would stand trial for assaulting a 60-year-old man who was not subject to mobilization under the law. While attempting to detain the man, they broke his arm, used a stun gun on him, and sprayed pepper spray in his direction.

Member of Parliament Heorhiy Mazurashu said that on May 28, in Novovolynsk, a man with a disability and his 14-year-old son were beaten by members of the TCR. In Kramatorsk, law enforcement officials are investigating the circumstances surrounding the death of Oleg Lysenko, born in 1987, who died on May 28 following an incident that occurred while he was being escorted by TCR staff.

On June 12, it was reported that an inspection conducted by representatives of the Verkhovna Rada Commissioner for Human Rights, Dmytro Lubinets, revealed that people with mental disorders and disabilities are being held at the Ternopil TCR.

On June 15, journalist Vitaliy Glagola said that a man was allegedly beaten in the Volovets district TCR and SS, which led to his death.

On June 16, the State Bureau of Investigation said it had uncovered a large-scale scheme of illegal coercion of citizens to mobilize, documented numerous facts of cruel treatment, illegal detention in the premises of the recruitment center, beatings, intimidation, and psychological pressure, and established individual facts of violent acts of a sexual nature.

On June 24, Ombudsman Dmytro Lubinets said that his office had to rescue several mobilized men from the Mykolaiv Oblast TCR and SS, where a number of human rights violations had been identified: a man with broken ribs who has legal grounds for deferment because he is the sole caregiver for his 80-year-old mother; two men suffering from serious illnesses; a man with viral hepatitis; a man with knee problems; and the father of a child with a disability.

On June 24, attorney Oleg Mitsik said on the “Noviny.Live” broadcast that he had encountered cases of people with serious illnesses and medical conditions being mobilized—conditions that, in his opinion, should have rendered them unfit for service, and said he found numerous cases involving questionable findings by military medical commissions.

On June 25, in Odessa, according to “Dumskaya”, during a failed attempt at forced mobilization, TCR officers took their anger out on his dog: they beat it, broke its paw, and threw it out of the van half a kilometer down the road.

On June 25, it was reported that, in the Chernivtsi Oblast, a man suffered a femoral neck fracture and became disabled as a result of actions by the police and the TCR employees — criminal proceedings were opened only after the ombudsman intervened.

On July 2, Human Rights Ombudsman Dmytro Lubinets reported that a father of many children in the Sheptytskyi Raion died the day after being mobilized; his relatives claim they found numerous bruises on his body.

According to the director of a Uzhhorod hospital, a man who fell from a third-floor window of the district's TCR building on July 8 later died in hospital.

On July 10, Oleksiy Goncharenko, a member of the Ukrainian Parliament, reported that a confrontation occurred in Volyn between TCR employees and a taxi driver—whose car contained a pregnant woman—during which a TCR employee sprayed tear gas inside the taxi despite the presence of the pregnant woman.

Informator.Live reports that on July 18, a TCR employee in Odessa used tear gas, causing eye burns to a 12-year-old girl.

On July 21, the Verkhovna Rada Commissioner for Human Rights, Dmytro Lubinets, stated that in his opinion, 90% of mobilization cases involve human rights violations.

On July 22, Yevhen Holovakha, director of the Institute of Sociology of the National Academy of Sciences, reported that more than half of Ukrainians consider mobilization to be the country's main current problem, followed by corruption and low living standards.

Local media report that on July 27, personnel from the TCR and SS injured women who were trying to protect a man from forced mobilization: one was shot with a firearm, another had pepper spray sprayed in her face, and a third had her leg run over by a minibus.

On July 28, lawyer Polina Marchenko stated that there have been cases where lawyers who come to territorial recruitment centers to defend their clients have had their arms, legs, and fingers broken, and have been subjected to physical force.

On August 4, People's Deputy Anton Yatsenko noted that a local resident in Talne was pulled out of the car by employees of the Cherkasy Oblast TCR in balaclavas, after first breaking the window.

On August 5, a case was submitted to court regarding a instructor being accused of torturing a conscript in Zakarpattia Oblast.

On August 10, the Ukrainian Parliament Commissioner for Human Rights, Dmytro Lubinets, reported the persecution of an ombudsman's representative who had exposed violations by employees of the TCR and SS.

The Red Cross and Lubinets said that on August 14, in the Mykolaiv Oblast, a Emergency Response Unit (IFRC) driver that was evacuating two families from Kherson was stopped by police at a checkpoint for a document check, which resulted in the driver being taken to a collection point to undergo a military medical examination as he was subject to mobilization, leaving the families he was transporting. Another driver took over the transportation of the families. Lubinets said that an internal investigation had been launched into the legality of the policeman's actions, adding that ″it is unacceptable for the actions of state bodies to jeopardize the evacuation of civilians from territories under Russian shelling″.

On August 18 the Prosecutor General of Ukraine, Ruslan Kravchenko, said that ten servicemen from one of the district TCR and SS in Odessa had been notified of suspicion of kidnapping and torture. The investigation identified at least eight victims who were subjected to physical abuse and violence.

== See also ==
- Ukrainian conscription crisis
- Mobilization in Ukraine
- Impressment
- Busification
