= Mobilization in Ukraine =

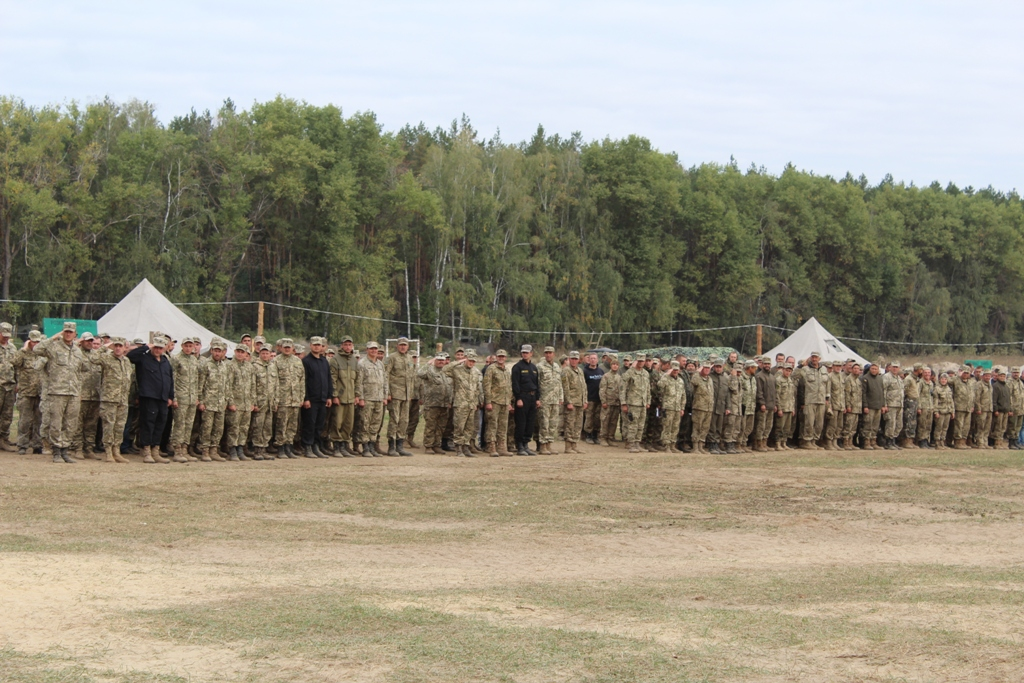
Reservists at a training ground, 15 September 2016.

A general (previously partial) mobilization into the Armed Forces of Ukraine has been taking place in Ukraine since 2014.

Earlier, mobilization was not carried out, but conscription in Ukraine into the armed forces was. The call existed until 2013. On 14 October 2013, Viktor Yanukovych signed Decree of the President of Ukraine No. 562/2013, according to which, from 1 January 2014, conscription into the armed forces was suspended and further recruitment was to be carried out exclusively on a contract basis. After the Euromaidan, voluntary recruitment into the Armed Forces was canceled, and later mobilization began in them. The Ministry of Defense stated that the annual mobilization will take place in several stages. In accordance with Decree No. 303 of 17 March 2014, partial mobilization of those liable for military service was started and continued for many years.

== History ==
In accordance with Decree No. 303 of 17 March 2014, a partial mobilization of those liable for military service was started. On 1 May 2014, due to the aggravation of the situation in eastern Ukraine, conscription for military service, canceled during the reign of Yanukovych, was restored, that is, the transition to professional armed forces was canceled. On 6 May 2014, another partial mobilization was announced.

After the completion of the planned waves of mobilization in 2015, on 14 September, a month before the local elections in the country, President of Ukraine Petro Poroshenko announced that he had made a decision "under the conditions of the actual implementation of the ceasefire regime, to postpone mobilization, not to conduct and not to announce". However, on 11 January 2016, Poroshenko stated that as soon as he received an appeal from the General Staff of the Armed Forces of Ukraine with a request to announce mobilization, he would immediately do it. On 15 January, the press service of the General Staff announced the mobilization planned for 2016.

As part of the six waves of mobilization that took place in 2014–2015, 210 thousand people were called up for military service, every sixth of them was registered as a volunteer. Three waves were held in 2014 and three more in 2015. Those called up as part of the fourth wave changed those called up in the first wave, the fifth changed the second, and the sixth – the third, the rotation period was about a year.

Starting from the third wave of mobilization, it includes those liable for military service who did not serve in the army. They undergo training for a month, after which they are sent to units, including to the zone of armed conflict.

For draft evasion for mobilization in accordance with Art. 336 of the Criminal Code of Ukraine provides for imprisonment for a term of two to five years. At the beginning of 2016, according to the register of court decisions, Ukrainian courts signed hundreds of convictions under this article.

In November 2015, the General Staff of the Armed Forces of Ukraine reported 2,673 military deaths, including 831 non-combat losses (careless handling of ammunition, suicide, road accidents, etc.), and more than 8,000 troops were injured.

=== 2014 ===
On 1 March 2014, the National Security and Defense Council of Ukraine adopted, as well Acting President of Ukraine Oleksandr Turchynov put into effect the decision to put the army on full combat readiness and conduct training camps with the required number of conscripts.

On 17 March 2014, the Verkhovna Rada (Ukraine's national parliament) approved the draft law “On Approval of the Presidential Decree “On Partial Mobilization””, according to the explanatory note to which the need for this decision “is due to the aggravation of the socio-political situation on the Crimean Peninsula, undisguised aggression, the seizure by the Russian side of part of the territory Autonomous Republic of Crimea and the city of Sevastopol". The mobilization was planned within 45 days from the date of its entry into force in order to call up 20 thousand people and the same number to the newly created National Guard. By 24 March 2014, more than 10,000 citizens had already been mobilized into the Ukrainian army as part of partial mobilization.

On 6 May, the Verkhovna Rada of Ukraine extended the partial mobilization and demobilization of those called up, and the Acting President of Ukraine Oleksandr Turchynov signed a decree on partial mobilization in Ukraine, according to which additional forces throughout Ukraine were called up for 45 days.

Ukrainian society reacted to mobilizations with discontent and protests.

The third stage of partial mobilization started on 24 July, when a day earlier, President of Ukraine Petro Poroshenko signed the relevant law, approved by the parliament with the votes of 232 deputies (with the minimum required 226) – the Communist Party of Ukraine and the Party of Regions opposed the mobilization, and some of the deputies – for its implementation only after the declaration of martial law; the borderline level of support for deputies caused criticism of the president. Recruitment was planned in all regions of the country, except Crimea, for 45 days. The third wave of mobilization ended on 9 September 2014.

Over 105,000 people were mobilized in 2014.

=== 2015 ===
From January to April 2015, the fourth wave of mobilization was carried out, during which those called up in the first wave in 2014 were replaced. More than 40,000 troops were called up.

Carrying out the fifth and sixth stages of mobilization in the spring and summer of 2015 was complicated due to a large number of draft dodgers. To fulfill the plan, the military commissars handed out summonses at checkpoints at the entrance to settlements, in supermarkets, at checkpoints of manufacturing enterprises, on the streets, and in public transport. The plan of the sixth stage, which ended on 17 August, was completed by only 60%, the shortfall was compensated by the admission of contract servicemen to the Armed Forces of Ukraine.

In total, about 104 thousand people were mobilized in 2015.

=== 2016 ===
The main focus in 2016 was intended to be on contract service in the army. In connection with the increase in the minimum salary of a serviceman to 7,000 hryvnias (almost $300 at the exchange rate on 1 February), a significantly increased number of people wishing to enter contract service is noted, for example, in January alone, the contract was signed by 400 people, by the beginning of March – more than 6 thousand, by the first half of April – more than 18 thousand, by the beginning of June – more than 32 thousand.

On 29 March, the decree of President Poroshenko on the transfer to the reserve of military personnel of the fourth wave of mobilization (about 45 thousand) came into force.

On 24 June, the decree of President Poroshenko on the transfer to the reserve of military personnel of the fifth wave of mobilization (about 17 thousand) came into force.

According to the Chief of the General Staff Viktor Muzhenko, the demobilization of the sixth wave of conscripts was planned to take place in August–September 2016.

=== 2022 ===
On 24 February 2022, Ukrainian President Volodymyr Zelenskyy signed a decree on the general mobilization of the population in the Russian invasion of Ukraine. Conscripts and reservists were called up over the next 90 days to "ensure the defense of the state, maintaining combat and mobilization readiness". Men between the ages of 18 and 60 were prohibited from leaving the country.

=== 2024 ===
In April 2024, President Zelenskyy signed a new mobilization law to increase the number of troops. He also signed into law a measure lowering Ukraine's army mobilization age from 27 to 25. In December 2024, Zelenskyy resisted pressure from the Biden administration to lower the conscription age to 18 to replace Ukraine's battlefield losses.

== See also ==
- Ukrainian conscription crisis
- 2022 mobilization in the Donetsk People's Republic and the Luhansk People's Republic
- 2022 Russian mobilization
