= Outline of the Russo-Ukrainian war =

Russo-Ukrainian war
- Part of the conflicts in territory of the former Soviet Union
- Zones of control in Ukraine as of 15 November 2026; Continuously controlled by Ukraine; Occupied and held by Russia; Regained or occupied by Ukraine; For a more detailed map, see the Russo-Ukrainian War detailed map
Date	20 February 2014 – present (12 years, 8 months, 3 weeks and 5 days)
Location	Ukraine
Status	Ongoing

Commanders and leaders
Ukraine; Volodymyr Zelenskyy; Petro Poroshenko; Oleksandr Turchynov; Oleksii Reznikov; Valerii Zaluzhnyi	Russia; Vladimir Putin; Sergei Shoigu; Valery Gerasimov; Yevgeny Prigozhin; Ramzan Kadyrov

The following outline is provided as an overview of and topical guide to the Russo-Ukrainian war.

The war is an ongoing international conflict between Russia (alongside Russian-backed separatists) and Ukraine which began in February 2014. Following Ukraine's Revolution of Dignity, Russia's annexion of Crimea from Ukraine and it's support towards pro-Russian separatists to fight the Ukrainian military in the Donbas war. The first eight years of conflict included naval incidents, cyberwarfare, and heightened political tensions. In February 2022, Russia launched a full-scale invasion of Ukraine in a major escalation of the conflict.

== Overview of articles ==
Timeline of the Russo-Ukrainian war (2022–present)
- Prelude; (up to 23 February 2022); Initial invasion; (24 February – 7 April 2022); Southeastern front; (8 April – 28 August 2022); 2022 Ukrainian counteroffensives; (29 August – 11 November 2022); Second stalemate; (12 November 2022 – 7 June 2023); 2023 Ukrainian counteroffensive; (8 June 2023 – 31 August 2023); 2023 Ukrainian counteroffensive, cont.; (1 September – 30 November 2023); 2023–2024 winter campaigns; (1 December 2023 – 31 March 2024); 2024 spring and summer campaigns; (1 April – 31 July 2024); 2024 summer–autumn offensives; (1 August – 31 December 2024); 2025 winter–spring offensives; (1 January 2025 – 31 May 2025); 2025 summer offensives; (1 June 2025 – 31 August 2025); 2025 autumn–winter offensives; (1 September 2025 – 31 December 2025); 2026 winter–spring offensives; (1 January 2026 – 31 May 2026); 2026 summer offensives; (1 June 2026 – 31 August 2026); 2026 autumn–winter offensives; (1 September 2026 – present)

=== Top-level overview articles ===
- Russo-Ukrainian war
  - 2014 Russian annexation of Crimea
  - War in Donbas
  - Russo-Ukrainian war (2022–present)
    - Prelude to the 2022 Russian invasion of Ukraine
    - 2022 Russian invasion of Ukraine
    - Ukrainian resistance in Russian-occupied Ukraine

=== Timelines ===
- Timeline of the Russian annexation of Crimea
- Timeline of the 2014 pro-Russian unrest in Ukraine
- Timeline of the war in Donbas
  - 2014, 2015, 2016, 2017, 2018, 2019, 2020, 2021, 2022
- Timeline of the Russo-Ukrainian war (2022–present):

=== Years in Russia ===
- 2014, 2015, 2016, 2017, 2018, 2019, 2020, 2021, 2022, 2023, 2024, 2025, 2026, 2027

=== Years in Ukraine ===
- 2014, 2015, 2016, 2017, 2018, 2019, 2020, 2021, 2022, 2023, 2024, 2025, 2026, 2027

== Subjects ==
An alphabetical list of subjects related to the war. Articles related to a subject are listed alphabetically under the main subject.

=== Participants ===
- Combatants of the war in Donbas
- Casualties of the Russo-Ukrainian war
- Ukrainian resistance in Russian-occupied Ukraine

=== Historical background ===
- Armed Forces of Ukraine
- Budapest Memorandum
- Controversy in Russia regarding the legitimacy of eastward NATO expansion
- Dissolution of the Soviet Union
- Enlargement of NATO
- 2007 Munich speech of Vladimir Putin
- NATO open door policy
- Russia–Ukraine gas disputes
- Russia under Vladimir Putin
- 2003 Tuzla Island conflict

=== Prelude to the war ===
A chronological list of articles about the period immediately prelude to war; for earlier articles see the Historical background section.

- Orange Revolution
- Euromaidan
- 2014 pro-Russian unrest in Ukraine
- Minsk agreements
- 2014 Hrushevsky Street protests
- Revolution of Dignity
- 2014 Odesa clashes
- Prelude to the Russian invasion of Ukraine
- Belarus–European Union border crisis
- Kerch Strait incident
- Martial law in Ukraine in 2018
- Donbas War

=== Civil Defense ===
- Martial law in Ukraine
- Mobilization in Ukraine

=== Communications and the media ===
- Look for Your Own
- Never Ever Can We Be Brothers
- I Want to Live (hotline)
- I Want to Reach my Own

==== Media ====
- Media portrayal of the Russo-Ukrainian War
- Reactions to the Russian invasion of Ukraine
- Reactions to the 2021–2022 Russo-Ukrainian crisis
- List of journalists killed during the Russo-Ukrainian War
- Disinformation in the Russian invasion of Ukraine
- Media Center Ukraine
- Krasovsky case
- Novaya Gazeta
- Russian 2022 war censorship laws
- Ukrinform

==== Slogans, visual expressions, and symbols ====
- Putin khuylo!
- Putler
- Slava Ukraini
- Russian warship, go fuck yourself
- Soviet imagery during the Russo-Ukrainian War
- Z (military symbol)
- Strength is in truth
- Where have you been for eight years?
- Destroyed Russian military equipment exhibition
- Grain From Ukraine program
- Religion and the Russian invasion of Ukraine
- White-blue-white flag

==== Propaganda, sham elections, and disinformation ====
- Disinformation in the Russian invasion of Ukraine
- Roskomnadzor
- Max (app)
- Internet Research Agency
- 2025 internet restrictions in Russia
- Crimean consensus
- Ruwiki (Wikipedia fork)
- Declaration of Independence of the Republic of Crimea (11 March 2014)
- 2014 Crimean status referendum (16 March 2014)
- 2014 Donbas status referendums (11 May 2014)
- 2014 Crimean parliamentary election (14 September 2014)
- 2014 Donbas general elections (2 November 2014)
- 2018 Donbas general elections (11 November 2018)
- 2019 Crimean parliamentary election (9 September 2019)
- 2022 annexation referendums in Russian-occupied Ukraine (23–27 September 2022)
- 2023 elections in Russian-occupied Ukraine (8–10 September 2019)
- Special military operation
- On the Historical Unity of Russians and Ukrainians
- Address concerning the events in Ukraine
- Ukraine bioweapons conspiracy theory
- What Russia Should Do with Ukraine
- Manifesto of the South Russian People's Council
- Disinformation Governance Board

=== Crimea ===
- Russian occupation of Crimea

=== Economics and food ===
- Black Sea Grain Initiative
- Economic impact of the Russian invasion of Ukraine
- Grain From Ukraine program
- People's Bayraktar
- 2022 Russian crude oil price cap sanctions
- Signmyrocket.com

=== Effects within Russia ===
- 2022 Russian martial law
- 2022 Russian mobilization
- 2022 Moscow rally
- 2022 Moscow Victory Day Parade

=== Elections and referendums ===
- 2014 Ukrainian local elections (Kyiv)
- 2014 Ukrainian presidential election (25 May 2014) (Opinion polling)
- 2014 Ukrainian parliamentary election (26 October 2014) (Opinion polling)
- 2015 Ukrainian local elections
- 2019 Ukrainian presidential election (31 March 2019) (Opinion polling)
- 2019 Ukrainian parliamentary election (21 July 2019) (Opinion polling)
- 2020 Ukrainian local elections (Kyiv, Cherkasy, Kharkiv)
- Next Ukrainian presidential election (Opinion polling)
- Next Ukrainian parliamentary election (Opinion polling)
- Next Ukrainian local elections

=== Energy ===
- Russia–Ukraine gas disputes
- Nord Stream, Nord Stream 2
- Russia in the European energy sector

=== Gender ===
- LGBTQ people in the Russo-Ukrainian War
- Women in the war in Donbas
- Women in the Russian invasion of Ukraine

=== Human rights, war crimes, genocide ===
==== Human rights ====
- Humanitarian situation during the war in Donbas
- 2022 mobilization in the Donetsk People's Republic and the Luhansk People's Republic

==== War crimes ====
- 2022 Russian theft of Ukrainian grain
- Bucha massacre
- Child abductions in the Russo-Ukrainian War
- International Criminal Court investigation in Ukraine
- Izium mass graves
- Makiivka surrender incident
- Murder of Yevgeny Nuzhin
- Russian filtration camps for Ukrainians
- Russian strikes on hospitals during the Russian invasion of Ukraine
- Russian torture chambers in Ukraine
- Sexual violence in the Russian invasion of Ukraine
- Torture and castration of a Ukrainian POW in Pryvillia
- Torture of Russian soldiers in Mala Rohan
- Use of incendiary weapons in the Russo-Ukrainian War
- War crimes in the Russian invasion of Ukraine

==== Sexual violence ====
- Sexual violence in the Russian invasion of Ukraine

==== Genocide ====
- Allegations of genocide in Donbas
- Allegations of genocide of Ukrainians in the Russo-Ukrainian War
- What Russia Should Do with Ukraine

==== Dislocation of the Ukrainian population ====
The following section includes forced movement (e.g. ethnic cleansing) and crisis movement (e.g. war refugees/evacuees).

- Russian filtration camps for Ukrainians
- 2022 evacuation of the Donetsk People's Republic and the Luhansk People's Republic
- Ukrainian refugee crisis
- 2022 mobilization in the Donetsk People's Republic and the Luhansk People's Republic

==== Prosecution of war criminals ====
- Trial of Vadim Shishimarin
- Trial of Alexander Bobikin and Alexander Ivanov
- International Criminal Court arrest warrants for Vladimir Putin and Maria Lvova-Belova

==== Other subjects ====
- Russian usage of mobile crematoriums in Ukraine
- 2014 Russian sabotage activities in Ukraine
- Scam call centers in Ukraine
- Assassination of Vladlen Tatarsky

==== Public opinion and national morale ====
- Be Brave Like Ukraine
- Ukrainian Freedom Orchestra
- United24
- United News (telethon)
- Destroyed Russian military equipment exhibition

=== Nationalism ===
- Pan-Slavism

==== Russian ====
- Russian nationalism
- Angry patriots
- Donbas separatism
- Novorossiya
- Russian irredentism
- Russian world
- Ruscism
- Putinism
- Russian imperialism
- Russification

==== Ukrainian ====
- Ukrainian nationalism
- Far-right politics in Ukraine
- Greater Ukraine
- Ukrainization
- History of Ukrainian nationality

=== Occupations ===
Overviews

- Russian-occupied territories of Ukraine

Areas

- Snake Island campaign
- Donetsk People's Republic
- Luhansk People's Republic
- Russian occupation of Chernihiv Oblast
- Russian occupation of Crimea
- Russian occupation of Kharkiv Oblast
- Russian occupation of Kherson Oblast
- Russian occupation of Kyiv Oblast
- Russian occupation of Mykolaiv Oblast
- Russian occupation of Sumy Oblast
- Russian occupation of Zaporizhzhia Oblast
- Russian occupation of Zhytomyr Oblast

=== Peace issues ===
- Peace negotiations in the Russo-Ukrainian war
- Minsk agreements
- Peace negotiations in the Russo-Ukrainian war (2022–present)
- Crimea Platform

=== Prisoners of war ===
- Torture of Russian soldiers in Mala Rohan
- Torture and castration of a Ukrainian POW in Pryvillia
- Murder of Yevgeny Nuzhin
- Makiivka surrender incident

=== Psychological ===
- I Want to Live (hotline)
- Never Ever Can We Be Brothers
- Ukrainian recognition of the Chechen Republic of Ichkeria

== Geography ==
- Joint Forces Operation (Ukraine)

=== Geographic overview ===
- Geography of Ukraine
- Eastern Ukraine, Western Ukraine, Southern Ukraine, Central Ukraine
- Crimea, Snake Island (Ukraine), Black Sea, Kerch Peninsula, Sea of Azov, Kerch Strait
- Administrative divisions of Ukraine
- Historical regions in present-day Ukraine

=== Oblasts ===
An oblast is a type of administrative division within the Russian empire and Soviet Union that continues to be used in Russia and some post-Imperial/Soviet states.

Oblasts
Cherkasy; Chernihiv; Chernivtsi; Dnipropetrovsk; Donetsk; Ivano-Frankivsk; Kharkiv; Kherson; Khmelnytskyi; Kyiv; Kirovohrad; Luhansk; Lviv; Mykolaiv; Odesa; Poltava; Rivne; Sumy; Ternopil; Vinnytsia; Volyn; Zakarpattia; Zaporizhzhia; Zhytomyr
Autonomous republic	Cities with special status
Autonomous Republic of Crimea	City of Kyiv; City of Sevastopol

=== Urban centers ===
- Kyiv, Kharkiv, Odesa, Mariupol, Amvrosiivka, Luhansk, Kerch, Bucha, Bakhmut, Kherson
- Azovstal Iron and Steel Works, Crimean Bridge
- Hero City of Ukraine

=== Territorial changes ===
An alphabetical outline of territorial changes during the war.

- Annexation of Crimea
- Annexation of Donetsk, Kherson, Luhansk and Zaporizhzhia
- Political status of Crimea
- Russian-occupied territories of Ukraine
- 2014 Donbas status referendums
- Territorial control during the Russo-Ukrainian War

==== Areas under Russian occupation ====
- Russian occupation of Crimea
- Donetsk People's Republic
- Russian occupation of Kharkiv Oblast
- Russian occupation of Kherson Oblast
- Luhansk People's Republic
- Russian occupation of Mykolaiv Oblast
- Russian occupation of Zaporizhzhia Oblast
- Russian occupation of Chernihiv Oblast (liberated)
- Russian occupation of Kyiv Oblast (liberated)
- Snake Island campaign (liberated)
- Russian occupation of Sumy Oblast (liberated)
- Russian occupation of Zhytomyr Oblast (liberated)

== Events ==
A chronological outline of events. Articles related to particular events are listed alphabetically under the main article for the event they are related to.

=== Protests and unrest ===
- 2014 anti-war protests in Russia
- 2022 protests in Russian-occupied Ukraine
- Protests against the Russian invasion of Ukraine
- Anti-war protests in Russia (2022–present)
- 2014 pro-Russian unrest in Ukraine
- 2022 Russian Far East protests
- 2022 open letter from Nobel laureates in support of Ukraine

=== Military operations and activities ===
A chronological outline of military operations. Articles related to particular battles are listed alphabetically under the main article for the operation they are related to.

==== Chronological ====
When an event or topic covers more than one year the article appears in the year the event started.

===== 2014 =====
Overviews

- 2014 Russian sabotage activities in Ukraine
- Russian occupation of Luhansk Oblast (April 2014)
- Russian occupation of Donetsk Oblast (April 2014)

Events

- 2014 Russian cross-border shelling of Ukraine (11 July – September 2014)
- 2014 Simferopol incident (18 March 2014)
- 2014 Ukrainian Air Force Ilyushin Il-76 shootdown (14 June 2014)
- Battle in Shakhtarsk Raion (16 July – 26 August 2014)
- Battle of Horlivka (20 July – 6 September 2014)
- Battle of Ilovaisk (10 August – 2 September 2014)
- Battle of Kramatorsk (12 April – 5 July 2014)
- Battle of Krasnyi Lyman (11 may – 19 June 2014)
- Battle of Mariupol (May–June 2014) (6 May – 14 June 2014)
- Battle of Novoazovsk (25–28 August 2014)
- Battles of Sievierodonetsk (2014) (22 May – 22 July 2014)
- Siege of Sloviansk (12 April – 5 July 2014)
- Capture of Donetsk (2014) (1 March – 11 May 2014)
- Capture of Southern Naval Base (3 – 26 March 2014)
- Capture of the Crimean Parliament (27 February 2014)
- Fights on the Ukrainian–Russian border (2014) (12 June – 7 August 2014)
- First Battle of Donetsk Airport (26–27 May 2014)
- Raid of the 95th Brigade (19 July – 10 August 2014)
- Novosvitlivka refugee convoy attack (18 August 2014)
- Battle of Mariupol (September 2014) (4–8 September 2014)
- Second Battle of Donetsk Airport (28 September 2014 – 21 January 2015)
- Shelling of Donetsk, Rostov Oblast (13 July 2014)
- Siege of Sloviansk (12 April – 5 July 2014)
- Siege of the Luhansk border base (2 – 4 June 2014)
- Zelenopillia rocket attack (11 July 2014)

===== 2015 =====
- Battle of Debaltseve (16 January – 20 February 2015)
- Battle of Marinka (2015) (3 June 2015)
- Shyrokyne standoff (10 February – 3 July 2015)
- January 2015 Mariupol rocket attack (24 January 2015)

===== 2016 =====
- Battle of Svitlodarsk (18–23 December 2016)

===== 2017 =====
- Battle of Avdiivka (29 January – 4 February 2017)

===== 2018 =====
- Kerch Strait incident (25 November 2018)

===== 2021 =====
- 2021 Black Sea incident (23 – 24 June 2021)
- Zapad 2021 (10 – 15 September 2021)

===== 2022 =====
Overviews

- Russian invasion of Ukraine order of battle
- 2022 Kharkiv counteroffensive (6 September – 2 October 2022)
- 2022 Kherson counteroffensive (29 August – 11 November 2022)
- Battle of Donbas (2022) (18 April – September 2022)
- Eastern front of the Russian invasion of Ukraine (24 February 2022 – present)
- Northern front of the Russian invasion of Ukraine (24 February – 8 April 2022)
- Southern front of the Russian invasion of Ukraine (24 February 2022 – present)

Events

- Ivano-Frankivsk strikes (2022–present) (24 February 2022 – present)
- Kryvyi Rih strikes (2022–present) (24 February 2022 – present)
- Lviv strikes (2022–present) (24 February 2022 – present)
- Zaporizhzhia strikes (2022–present) (24 February 2022 – present)
- 2022 Chornobaivka attacks (27 February – 5 November 2022)
- Crimea attacks (2022–present) (31 July 2022 – present)
- Dnipro strikes (2022–present) (11 March 2022 – present)
- 2022 missile explosion in Poland 15 November 2022
- 2022 Saky air base attack (9 August 2022)
- 2022 attack on Nova Kakhovka (11 July 2022)
- Battle of Donbas (2022) (18 April – September 2022)
- Battle of Pisky (28 July – 24 August 2022)
- Battle of Popasna (3 March – 7 May 2022)
- Luhansk Oblast campaign (2 October 2022 – present)
- Battle of the Siverskyi Donets (5–13 May 2022)
- Battle of Volnovakha (25 February – 12 March 2022)
- 2022 Berdiansk port attack (24 March 2022)
- Chuhuiv air base attack (24 February 2022)
- Desna barracks airstrike (17 May 2022)
- Battle of Lyman (September–October 2022) (3 September – 2 October 2022)
- Millerovo air base attack (25 February 2022)
- Sinking of the Moskva (14 April 2022)
- Vinnytsia strikes (2022–present) (6 March – 14 July 2022)
- Yavoriv military base attack (13 March 2022)

===== 2023 =====
- 2023 Ukrainian counteroffensive (8 June 2023 – present)
- Under construction

Event

- Missile strike on the Black Sea Fleet headquarters (22 September 2023)

==== Geographic ====
Articles organized by geographic region

===== Eastern Ukraine =====
Overviews

- Eastern front of the Russo-Ukrainian war (2022–present)
- 2022 Kharkiv counteroffensive
- Joint Forces Operation (Ukraine)
- Pokrovsk offensive
- Northern Kharkiv front of the Russo-Ukrainian War

Events

- Battle of Avdiivka (2023–2024)
- Battle of Bakhmut
- Battle of Donbas (2022)
- Battle of Izium
- Battle of Kharkiv (2022)
- Battle of Kurakhove
- Battle of Lyman (September–October 2022)
- Battle of Lysychansk
- Battle of Marinka (2022–2023)
- Battle of Pisky
- Battle of Popasna
- Battle of Rubizhne
- Battle of Sievierodonetsk (2022)
- Battle of Soledar
- Luhansk Oblast campaign
- Battle of Volnovakha
- Battle of the Siverskyi Donets
- Battle of Toretsk

===== Western Ukraine =====
- Ivano-Frankivsk strikes (2022–present)
- Lviv strikes (2022–present)

===== Southern Ukraine =====
Overviews

- Southern front of the Russo-Ukrainian war (2022–present)
- 2022 Kherson counteroffensive
- Crimea attacks

Events

- Battle of Kherson
- Liberation of Kherson
- Odesa strikes (2022–present)
- Capture of Melitopol
- Battle of Mykolaiv
- Battle of Mala Tokmachka
- Battle of Enerhodar
- Battle of Voznesensk
- Shelling of Huliaipole
- Battle of Davydiv Brid
- Siege of Mariupol

===== Northern Ukraine =====
Overviews

- Northern front of the Russian invasion of Ukraine
- Northern Ukraine border skirmishes

Events

- Battle of Antonov Airport
- Capture of Chernobyl
- Battle of Hostomel
- Battle of Bucha
- Battle of Irpin
- Battle of Makariv
- Battle of Brovary
- Battle of Slavutych
- Battle of Sumy
- Siege of Chernihiv

===== Central Ukraine =====
- Kryvyi Rih strikes (2022–present)
- Zaporizhzhia strikes (2022–present)

===== Crimea and the Black Sea =====
- Snake Island campaign
- Sinking of the Moskva

===== Outside Ukraine =====
- Kursk campaign (6 August 2024 – 16 March 2025)
- 2022 missile explosion in Poland
- 2025 Russian drone incursion into Poland
- 2026 drone incursions into the Baltic states and Finland
- 2026 drone incidents in Romania
- Attacks in Russia during the Russian invasion of Ukraine
- Shelling of Donetsk, Rostov Oblast (13 July 2014)

=== Attacks on civilians ===
- Russian attacks on civilians in the Russo-Ukrainian war (2022–present)
- Aerial warfare in the Russian invasion of Ukraine
- 16 March 2022 Chernihiv breadline attack
- 2015 Kharkiv bombing (22 February 2015)
- Dnipro strikes (2022–present) (11 March 2022 – present)
- Zhytomyr attacks (2022–present) (24 February 2022 – present)
- 3 March 2022 Chernihiv bombing
- April 2022 Kharkiv cluster bombing (15 April 2022)
- Assassination attempts on Volodymyr Zelenskyy
- Bilohorivka school bombing (7 May 2022)
- Bombing of Borodianka (March 2022)
- Bucha massacre (March 2022)
- Chaplyne railway station attack (24 August 2022)
- July 2022 Chasiv Yar missile strike (9 July 2022)
- February 2015 Kramatorsk rocket attack (10 February 2015)
- February 2022 Kharkiv cluster bombing (28 February 2022)
- Irpin refugee column shelling (6 March 2022)
- Izium mass graves (15 September 2022)
- January 2015 Mariupol rocket attack (24 January 2015)
- Kharkiv dormitories missile strike (17–18 August 2022)
- Kharkiv government building airstrike (1 March 2022)
- Kramatorsk railway station attack (8 April 2022)
- Kremenchuk shopping mall attack (27 June 2022)
- Kupiansk civilian convoy shelling (25 September 2022)
- Kyiv shopping centre bombing (20 March 2022)
- List of journalists killed during the Russo-Ukrainian War
- Maisky Market attack (13 June 2022)
- Malaysia Airlines Flight 17 (17 July 2014)
- March 2022 Donetsk attack (14 March 2022)
- March 2022 Kharkiv cluster bombing (24 March 2022)
- Mariupol hospital airstrike (9 March 2022)
- Mariupol theatre airstrike (16 March 2022)
- Murder of Pentecostals in Sloviansk (June 2014)
- Mykolaiv cluster bombing (13 March 2022)
- Mykolaiv government building missile strike (29 March 2022)
- Novosvitlivka refugee convoy attack (18 August 2014)
- Olenivka prison massacre (29 July 2022)
- Russian strikes against Ukrainian infrastructure (2022–present) (9 October 2022 – present)
- September 2022 Donetsk attack (19 September 2022)
- Serhiivka missile strike (1 July 2022)
- Stara Krasnianka care house attack (11 March 2022)
- Sumykhimprom ammonia leak (21 March 2022)
- Vinnytsia strikes (2022–present) (6 March – 14 July 2022)
- Volnovakha bus attack (13 January 2015)
- War crimes in the Russian invasion of Ukraine
- Zaporizhzhia civilian convoy attack (30 September 2022)
- 2022 Zaporizhzhia residential building airstrike (9 October 2022)

=== Cyberwarfare ===
- Russian information war against Ukraine
- Russo-Ukrainian cyberwarfare
- 2015 Ukraine power grid hack (December 2015)
- 2017 Ukraine ransomware attacks (June 2017)
- 2022 Ukraine cyberattacks (January – March 2022)
- 2016 Kyiv cyberattack (17 December 2016)
- Surkov leaks (October 2016, November 2017 & April 2018)
- Anonymous and the Russian invasion of Ukraine

=== Movement of the population ===
- 2022 evacuation of the Donetsk People's Republic and the Luhansk People's Republic

=== Illegal annexations ===
- 2022 annexation referendums in Russian-occupied Ukraine
- Russian annexation of Donetsk, Kherson, Luhansk and Zaporizhzhia oblasts

=== Diplomatic ===
- List of international presidential trips made by Volodymyr Zelenskyy
- 2022 visit by Volodymyr Zelenskyy to the United States
- May 2023 European visits by Volodymyr Zelenskyy
- 2023 visit by Volodymyr Zelenskyy to the United Kingdom
- 2025 Trump–Zelenskyy Oval Office meeting
- August 2025 White House multilateral meeting on Ukraine

== Individuals ==
An alphabetical list of individuals significantly related to the war.

Other lists:

- Women in the war in Donbas
- Women in the Russian invasion of Ukraine
- List of people and organizations sanctioned during the Russo-Ukrainian War

=== Russian figures ===
==== Political (pro-Russian) ====
- Alexander Bastrykin
- Aleksandr Dugin
- Ramzan Kadyrov
- Sergey Menyaylo
- Dmitry Ovsyannikov
- Vladimir Putin
- Mikhail Razvozhayev

==== Military (Russian aligned or controlled) ====
- Aleksandr Chayko
- Aleksandr Dvornikov
- Valery Gerasimov
- Sergei Shoigu
- Sergey Surovikin

==== Other (pro-Russian) ====
- Alexander Zakharchenko
- Arsen Pavlov
- Mikhail Tolstykh
- Igor Girkin
- Ivan Ilyin
- Yevgeny Prigozhin
- Dmitry Utkin
- Viktor Yanukovych

=== Anti-war russian figures ===
==== Politicians ====
- Alexei Navalny
- Maxim Katz
- Yekaterina Duntsova
- Boris Nadezhdin
- Grigory Yavlinsky
- Leonid Volkov
- Maria Pevchikh
- Ivan Zhdanov

==== Pro-ukrainian politicians ====
- Michael Nackee
- Alexander Nevzorov
- Aleksandr Skobov

==== Ukrainian combatants ====
- Maximilian Andronnikov (Pseudonym "Caesar")
- Denis Kapustin
- Ildar Dadin

=== Ukrainian figures ===
==== Political (pro-Ukrainian) ====
- Vadym Chernysh
- Vitali Klitschko
- Oksana Koliada
- Petro Poroshenko
- Oleksii Reznikov
- Oleksandr Turchynov
- Iryna Vereshchuk
- Volodymyr Zelenskyy

==== Military (Ukrainian aligned and controlled) ====
- Ruslan Khomchak
- Yevhen Moisiuk
- Oleksandr Syrskyi
- Valerii Zaluzhnyi

==== Journalists (pro-Ukrainian) ====
- Serhii Korovayny

=== Other nationalities ===
==== Political ====
- Alexander Lukashenko

== Military units, equipment, and bases ==
An alphabetical list of military units involved in a significant way the war.

- Combatants of the war in Donbas
- Foreign fighters in the Russo-Ukrainian war
- List of Russo-Ukrainian war military equipment

=== Russian military units ===
- 2022 Russian mobilization
- Chechen involvement in the Russo-Ukrainian War
- Russo-Ukrainian war (2022–present) order of battle
- Combatants of the war in Donbas

Command and organization

- Ministry of Defence (Russia)
- General Staff of the Armed Forces of the Russian Federation
- Russian Ground Forces
- Russian Navy
- Russian Aerospace Forces
- Russian Airborne Forces
- Special Operations Forces (Russia)
- National Guard of Russia

Units

This section contains articles about major formations or units with significance to the war. For a complete list see List of Russian units which invaded the territory of Ukraine (2014–2022)

- Little green men (Russo-Ukrainian War)
- Black Sea Fleet
- 76th Guards Air Assault Division
- 64th Separate Guards Motor Rifle Brigade
- Separate Special Purpose Battalion (Chechen)
- Russian separatist forces in Ukraine
- Russian Orthodox Army
- 14th Separate Guards Artillery Brigade
- Sparta Battalion
- 60th Separate Guards Motor Rifle Battalion
- Prizrak Brigade

=== Ukrainian military units ===
Command and organization

- Headquarters of the Supreme Commander-in-Chief
- Mobilization in Ukraine
- Ukrainian Air Assault Forces
- Armed Forces of Ukraine
- Ukrainian Ground Forces
- Ukrainian Air Force
- Ukrainian Navy
- Special Operations Forces (Ukraine)
- Ukrainian Marine Corps
- Ukrainian Naval Aviation
- Territorial Defence Forces (Ukraine)
- Ukrainian Sea Guard
- State Border Guard Service of Ukraine
- Ukrainian Air Defence Forces
- National Guard of Ukraine
- Special Police Forces (Ukraine)

Units

- 10th Mountain Assault Brigade
- 128th Mountain Assault Brigade (Ukraine)
- 14th Mechanized Brigade (Ukraine)
- 17th Heavy Mechanized Brigade (Ukraine)
- 1st Tank Brigade (Ukraine)
- 22nd Motorized Infantry Battalion (Ukraine)
- 24th Mechanized Brigade (Ukraine)
- 25th Airborne Brigade (Ukraine)
- 25th Public Security Protection Brigade
- 28th Mechanized Brigade (Ukraine)
- 30th Mechanized Brigade (Ukraine)
- 4th Tank Brigade (Ukraine)
- 53rd Mechanized Brigade (Ukraine)
- 54th Mechanized Brigade (Ukraine)
- 56th Motorized Brigade (Ukraine)
- 57th Motorized Brigade (Ukraine)
- 58th Motorized Brigade (Ukraine)
- 59th Assault Brigade
- 72nd Mechanized Brigade (Ukraine)
- 92nd Assault Brigade
- 93rd Mechanized Brigade (Ukraine)
- 95th Air Assault Brigade (Ukraine)
- Aidar Battalion
- Alpha Group (Ukraine)
- Azov Brigade
- Dnipro-1 Regiment
- Donbas Battalion
- Freedom of Russia Legion (Russian volunteers)
- Russian Volunteer Corps (Russian far-right volunteers)
- Georgian Legion (Ukraine) (Georgian volunteers)
- Hospitallers Medical Battalion
- Tactical group "Belarus" (Belarusian volunteers)
- Kastuś Kalinoŭski Regiment (Belarusian volunteers)
- Pahonia Regiment (Belarusian volunteers)
- Sheikh Mansur Battalion (Chechen volunteers)
- Dzhokhar Dudayev Battalion (Chechen volunteers)
- Ukrainian territorial defence battalions

=== Military equipment ===
- List of aviation shootdowns and accidents during the Russo-Ukrainian War
- List of ship losses during the Russo-Ukrainian War

Russian equipment

- List of equipment used by Russian people's militias in Ukraine

Ukrainian equipment

- List of equipment of the Armed Forces of Ukraine

NATO equipment

- Under construction

International equipment

- Under construction

=== Military bases and facilities ===
In Russia

- Engels-2 air base
- Millerovo air base

In Ukraine

- Sevastopol International Airport (Note: Russian occupied airport in Crimea used as a military airbase.)
- Sevastopol Naval Base (Note: Used by Russia black sea fleet)
- Yavoriv military base

=== Military exercises ===
- Union Resolve 2022 (February 10–20, 2022)

== Entities ==
=== Pro-Russian organizations ===
==== Russian political entities ====
- Eurasia Party (Youth Union)
- National Liberation Movement (Russia)
- Russian Community
- Liberal Democratic Party of Russia
- Communist Party of the Russian Federation
- A Just Russia
- United Russia
- The Other Russia of E. V. Limonov
- Slavic Union
- Russian Imperial Movement
- Club of Angry Patriots

==== Pro-russian Ukrainian movements ====
- Ukraine Salvation Committee
- Antifascist Committee of Ukraine
- Communist Party of the Donetsk People's Republic
- Special Coordinating Council for Security Enhancement
- Donetsk People's Republic
- Donetsk Republic (movement)
- Luhansk People's Republic
- New Russia Party
- Salvation Committee for Peace and Order
- Ukrainian Choice
- We Are Together with Russia
- Party of Shariy
- Opposition Platform — For Life
- Party of the Regions
- Our Land (Ukraine)
- Ukraine – Forward!
- Opposition Bloc
- Volodymyr Saldo Bloc
- Revival (Ukraine)
- Anti-Maidan

==== Other (pro-Russian) ====
- Wagner Group
- North Korea
- Belarus
- Donetsk PR
- Luhansk PR
- Transnistria
- Abkhazia
- South Ossetia
- Vietnam
- China
- Cuba
- Nicaragua
- Armenia
- Under construction

=== Pro Ukrainian organizations ===
==== Political (pro-Ukrainian) ====
- Ministry of National Unity of Ukraine
- Militsiya (Ukraine) (until 2015)
- National Police of Ukraine (from 2015)
- Ministry of Internal Affairs (Ukraine)
- Security Service of Ukraine

==== Military (Ukrainian controlled and aligned) ====
- International Legion (Ukraine)
- Headquarters of the Supreme Commander-in-Chief
- Freedom of Russia Legion
- Kastuś Kalinoŭski Regiment
- Berdiansk Partisan Army
- Popular Resistance of Ukraine
- Yellow Ribbon (movement)
- Separate Special Purpose Battalion (Chechen)

==== Other (Ukrainian controlled and aligned) ====
- IT Army of Ukraine
- Belarusian partisan movement (2020–present)
- Russian partisan movement (2022–present)

=== Other organizations ===
==== Political (3rd parties) ====
- Fidesz
- ANO 2011
- Direction – Social Democracy
- Patriotic Electoral Bloc
- Victory (political bloc)
- National Socialism / White Power

==== Russian anti-war movements ====
- Dawn (Russia)
- Yabloko
- OVD-Info
- Memorial Society
- Vesna (Russia)
- Left Socialist Action
- Navalny Headquarters
- Feminist Anti-War Resistance
- Russian Socialist Movement
- First Subdivision

==== Military (3rd parties) ====
- Under construction

==== Other (3rd parties) ====
- Under construction

== International involvement ==
=== Overviews ===
- Russia–United States relations
- Russia–NATO relations
- Ukraine–United States relations
- Ukraine–European Union relations
- Ukraine–NATO relations

=== International events ===
- 2014 G20 Brisbane summit (15–16 November 2014)
- 2014 Wales NATO summit (4–5 September 2014)
- 40th G7 summit (4–5 June 2014)
- Ukraine Recovery Conference
- Eleventh emergency special session of the United Nations General Assembly (opened on 28 February 2022)
- 2021 Russia–United States summit (16 June 2021)
- 2022 NATO virtual summit (25 February 2022)
- 2022 Brussels summit (24 March 2022)
- 2022 Madrid summit (29–30 June 2022)

=== Reactions ===
- Corporate responses to the Russian invasion of Ukraine
- Government and intergovernmental reactions to the Russian invasion of Ukraine
- International reactions to the war in Donbas
- Non-government reactions to the Russian invasion of Ukraine
- Reactions to the 2021–2022 Russo-Ukrainian crisis
- Reactions to the Russian invasion of Ukraine
- Unfriendly countries list
- International recognition of the Donetsk People's Republic and the Luhansk People's Republic

=== Sanctions ===
- International sanctions during the Russo-Ukrainian War
- List of people and organizations sanctioned during the Russo-Ukrainian War
- Restrictions on transit to Kaliningrad Oblast

=== Investigations ===
- Independent International Commission of Inquiry on Ukraine
- OSCE Special Monitoring Mission to Ukraine
- Task Force on Accountability for Crimes Committed in Ukraine
- United Nations Human Rights Monitoring Mission in Ukraine
- Independent International Commission of Inquiry on Ukraine
- International Criminal Court investigation in Ukraine

=== Other international involvement ===
- International recognition of the Donetsk People's Republic and the Luhansk People's Republic
- Legality of the Russian invasion of Ukraine
- Operation Atlantic Resolve, European Deterrence Initiative, NATO Enhanced Forward Presence
- 2018 Moscow–Constantinople schism
- Accession of Ukraine to the European Union
- Belarusian involvement in the Russo-Ukrainian war (2022–present)
- Foreign fighters in the Russo-Ukrainian War
- Ukraine v. Russian Federation (2017)
- Ukraine v. Russian Federation (2022)
- Universal jurisdiction investigations of war crimes in Ukraine
- Proposed no-fly zone in the Russian invasion of Ukraine

=== Military cooperation with the Russian Federation ===
- Zapad 2021
- Union Resolve 2022

=== Military cooperation with Ukraine ===
- European Union Military Assistance Mission in support of Ukraine
- People's Bayraktar
- 2022 Ramstein Air Base meeting

== Resolutions and statements ==
Items are listed chronologically within individual sections.

International organizations

- United Nations Security Council Resolution 2166 (21 July 2014)
- United Nations General Assembly Resolution ES-11/1 (March 2022)
- United Nations General Assembly Resolution ES-11/2 (March 2022)
- United Nations General Assembly Resolution ES-11/3 (April 2022)
- United Nations General Assembly Resolution ES-11/4 (October 2022)
- United Nations General Assembly Resolution ES-11/5 (November 2022)
- United Nations General Assembly Resolution ES-11/6 (February 2023)

Belarus

- Under construction

European Union

- Under construction

North Atlantic Treaty Organization

- Under construction

Russia

- On conducting a special military operation (24 February 2022)

Ukraine

- Ukrainian recognition of the Chechen Republic of Ichkeria (14 July 2022)

United States

- Support for the Sovereignty, Integrity, Democracy, and Economic Stability of Ukraine Act of 2014 (3 April 2014)
- Ukraine Democracy Defense Lend-Lease Act of 2022 (9 May 2022)
- 2022 State of the Union Address (1 March 2022)

Other

- 2022 open letter from Nobel laureates in support of Ukraine (1 March 2022)

== Books and publications ==
Books

- In Isolation: Dispatches from Occupied Donbas by Stanislav Aseyev

Academic journals

- Russia's War in Ukraine — The Devastation of Health and Human Rights by Berry S. Levy and Jennifer Leaning

Other

- Ami, it's time to go

Bibliographies

- Under construction

== Lists ==
- List of Black Sea incidents involving Russia and Ukraine
- List of military aid to Ukraine during the Russo-Ukrainian War
- List of humanitarian aid to Ukraine during the Russo-Ukrainian War
- List of damaged cultural sites during the Russian invasion of Ukraine
- List of Russo-Ukrainian War military equipment
- List of equipment used by Russian people's militias in Ukraine
- List of aviation shootdowns and accidents during the Russo-Ukrainian War
- List of ship losses during the Russo-Ukrainian War
- List of Russian units which invaded the territory of Ukraine (2014–2022)
- List of people and organizations sanctioned during the Russo-Ukrainian War
- List of journalists killed during the Russo-Ukrainian War
- List of military engagements during the Russo-Ukrainian war (2022–present)

== Other topics ==
- Operation Midas
- 2025 anti-corruption protests in Ukraine
- Assassination attempts on Volodymyr Zelenskyy
- 2023 Black Sea drone incident
- Bridges in the Russo-Ukrainian War
- 2022 Crimean Bridge explosion
- 2023 Crimean Bridge explosion
- Destruction of the Kakhovka Dam
- 2022 Irkutsk Sukhoi Su-30 crash
- Krymnash
- Landmines in Ukraine
- Nord Stream pipelines sabotage
- Rail war in Belarus (2022–present)
- Rail war in Russia (2022–present)
- Reactions to the 2021–2022 Russo-Ukrainian crisis
- Reparations from Russia after the Russo-Ukrainian War
- Restrictions on transit to Kaliningrad Oblast
- 2022 Russian Air Force Ilyushin Il-76 crash
- Russian mystery fires
- 2022 Transnistria attacks
- Ukraine and weapons of mass destruction
- 2022 Yeysk Su-34 crash
- Wagnergate
- Wagner Group rebellion

== See also ==
- Bibliography of Ukrainian history
- Bibliography of Russian history (1991–present)
