= Roman Chervinsky =

Ukrainian military and counterintelligence officer (born 1974)

- Роман Григорович Червінський
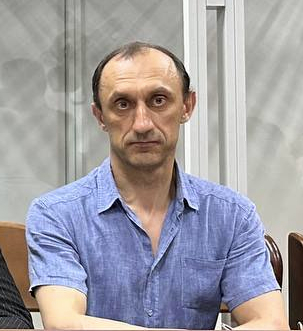
- Chervinsky in 2024
- Born: 2 December 1974 (age 51); Kamianets-Podilskyi, Ukrainian SSR, Soviet Union
- Education: National Academy of Security Service of Ukraine
- Military career
- Allegiance: Ukraine
- Branch: Security Service of Ukraine
- Rank: Colonel
- Conflicts: Russo-Ukrainian War; War in Donbas; Russian invasion of Ukraine
- Awards: Order of Bohdan Khmelnytsky, 2nd class; Order of Bohdan Khmelnytsky, 3rd class; Order for Courage, 3rd class; Medal "For Military Service to Ukraine"; Medal "For Undogged Service", 3rd class

Roman Hryhorovych Chervinsky (Ukrainian: Роман Григорович Червінський; born 2 August 1974) is a Ukrainian military and counterintelligence officer, colonel of the Security Service of Ukraine (SBU), former head of the 5th Directorate of the Counterintelligence Department of the SBU, acting commander of the military unit of the Special Operations Forces of the Armed Forces of Ukraine (SSO).

== Operations involving Chervinsky ==
Chervinsky was involved in the assassinations of Russian separatist military commanders Arsen Pavlov (better known by the nom de guerre "Motorola") in 2016 and Mikhail Tolstykh ("Givi") in 2017.

He also oversaw the recruitment of Svitlana Mykolaivna Dryuk, deputy commander of the separatist 11th Regiment "Vostok" (nom de guerre "Veterok") and her subsequent transfer from the occupied territory to the territory controlled by Ukraine (2019). Dryuk stated that she was ready to testify in court about the presence of Russian troops in Donbas (2018).

The capture, removal from the occupied city of Snizhne, Donetsk Oblast, and transportation to Kyiv of pro-Russian militant Volodymyr Tsemakh, involved in the downing of Malaysia Airlines Flight 17 (MH17) near Donetsk (2019). He was an important witness for the Hague Tribunal. Kyiv handed the witness over to Moscow as part of a prisoner exchange.

One of the most high-profile operations developed by Chervinsky was an attempt to lure and detain militants of the Russian private military company Wagner Group in Ukraine in the summer of 2020. Ukrainian intelligence officers, disguised as a security company for the Russian Rosneft, managed to smuggle 33 key militants allegedly involved in war crimes. The special operation was supposed to end with the forced landing of the plane carrying the militants in Ukraine and their detention. But at the last moment, the intelligence officers met with the Ukrainian political leadership and received an order to postpone the operation. Immediately after that, the Wagner members were arrested in Belarus and extradited to Russia. Chervinsky suggested that the failure of the operation occurred due to a leak of information from the Office of the President of Ukraine.

The operation to seize a Russian Aerospace Forces aircraft, which was carried out at the initiative of the SBU and was coordinated with the leadership of the Armed Forces of Ukraine. The operation resulted in losses in the Armed Forces of Ukraine (2022).

== Bombing of the Nord Stream pipelines ==
According to Der Spiegel, Chervinsky was part of a unit co-established by the CIA after the Maidan Revolution in 2014. A Ukrainian unit met with US agents shortly after Russia's invasion of Ukraine began in February 2022 to plan the bombing of Russian pipelines. The CIA reportedly appeared open to the idea at first and supported the project favorably. The plan to bomb pipelines was codenamed "Operation Diameter". Before the bombing of the Nord Stream natural gas pipelines on 26 September 2022, Nord Stream 1 had supplied about half of Germany's annual natural gas needs, bypassing Ukraine and Kyiv was losing out on transit fees. Nord Stream 2 was not yet operating.

Chervinskiy's role in the Nord Stream bombing, which run from Russia to Germany under the Baltic Sea, provided in 2023 the most direct evidence tying Ukraine's military to an act of sabotage that was called the largest act of sabotage in European history. Chervinsky's involvement contradicted President Zelensky's public denials of Ukrainian involvement.

The Washington Post claimed in November 2023 that Chervinskiy may have coordinated the Nord Stream bombing, namely managing the logistics and support of a six-person team that rented a sailboat and used diving equipment to plant explosives. The article assured that the operation was designed so that Ukrainian president Zelenskyy would not know about the operation (plausible deniability), and that everyone involved in its planning and execution reported directly to Valery Zaluzhny, Ukraine's highest-ranking military officer. Both Chervinsky and Zaluzhny denied their involvement in the pipeline bombing. The Washington Post article was also based on the leak of secret Pentagon documents by US armed services member Jack Teixeira in June 2022, that jeopardized the entire operation. The information that Ukraine was planning to attack Nord Stream first came from the Dutch military intelligence agency, the MIVD in June 2022 - three months before the underwater bombing. The CIA under the Biden administration received an intelligence report, as did the BND, under Chancellor Olaf Scholz. The information was then corroborated by security officials from a number of countries.

On 30 June, German Prosecutor General Jens Rommel filed formal charges against former captain in both the Security Service of Ukraine and at the time of the bombing captain in the Ukrainian Armed Forces, Serhiy Kuznetsov. According to investigators, he acted on behalf of the Ukrainian state authorities and, together with other military personnel, a total of seven Ukrainians are suspected of having belonged to the unit.

== Prosecution ==
The country's political leadership categorically denied the fact of the operation to capture the Wagner Group militants. On 5 August 2020, Zelenskyy dismissed Burba from the position of head of the State Security Service.

In September 2020, the head of the President's Office Andriy Yermak called this operation "a detective story, fabricated from beginning to end," and Zelenskyy "a delusion". But after the Bellingcat investigation, Zelenskyy still admitted: the HUR was planning some kind of operation, but did not receive approval from the OP. The term "Wagnergate" appeared in Ukraine.

Four direct participants in the operation with the Wagner group were dismissed. Some were not dismissed, but transferred to lower positions to intimidate, he assures. Some were transferred to other units.

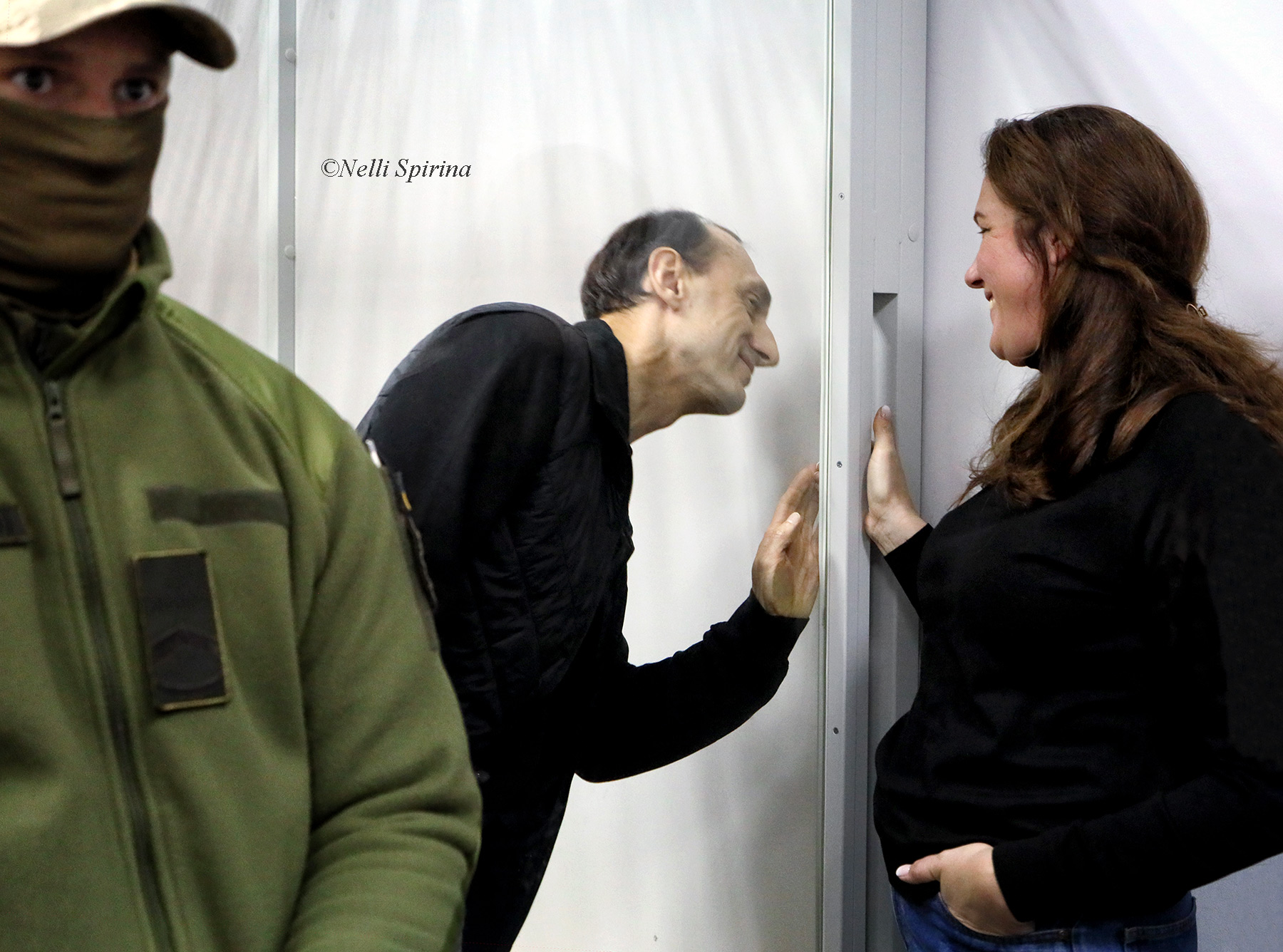
Roman Chervinsky's meeting with his wife Olga at the Shevchenko Court in Kyiv, 16 October 2023

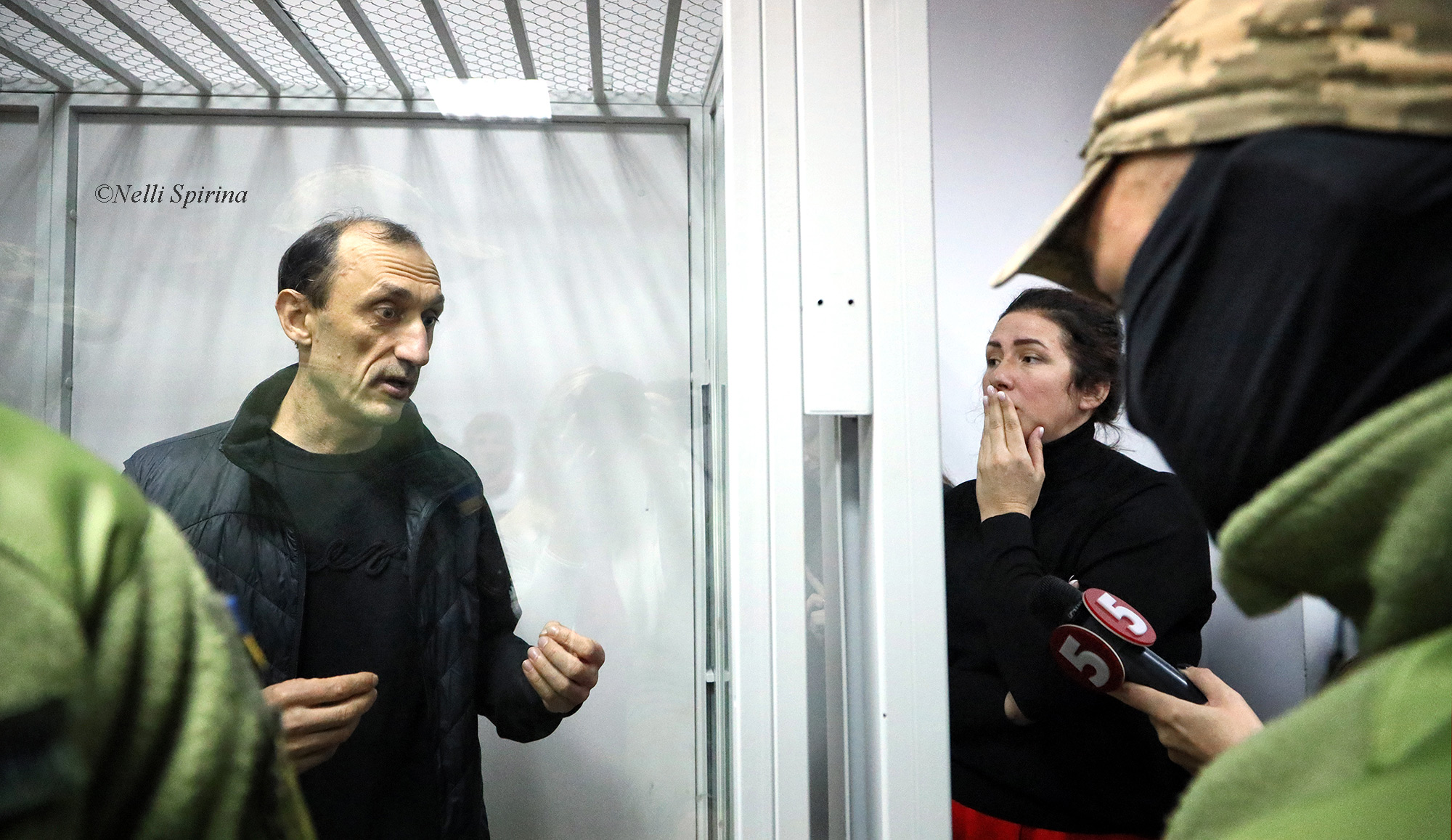
Roman Chervinsky gives an interview at the Shevchenko Court in Kyiv. His wife Olga listens. 18 October 2023

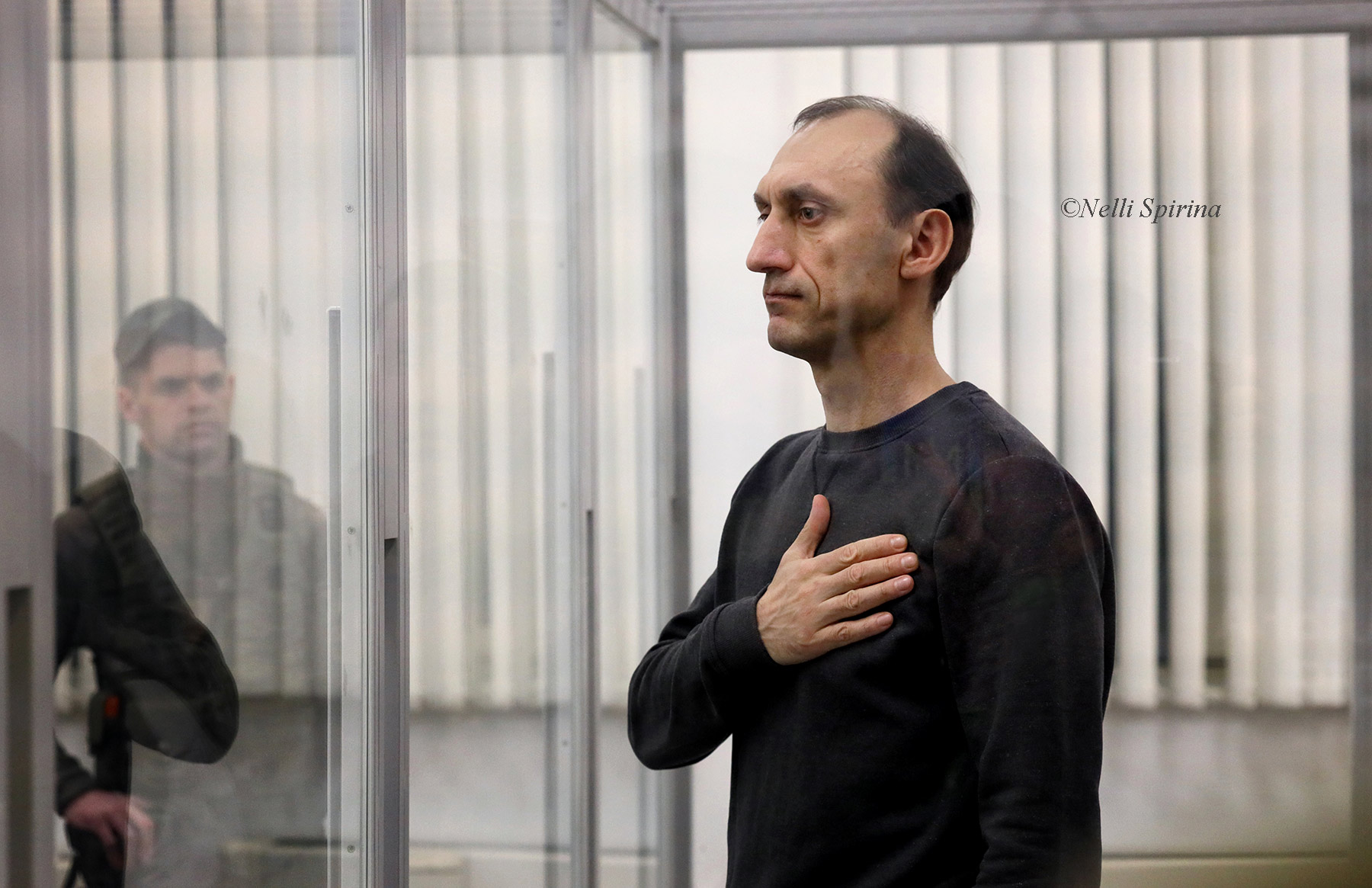
Roman Chervinsky during the performance of the Ukrainian anthem by his support group. Kyiv Court of Appeal. 18 October 2023

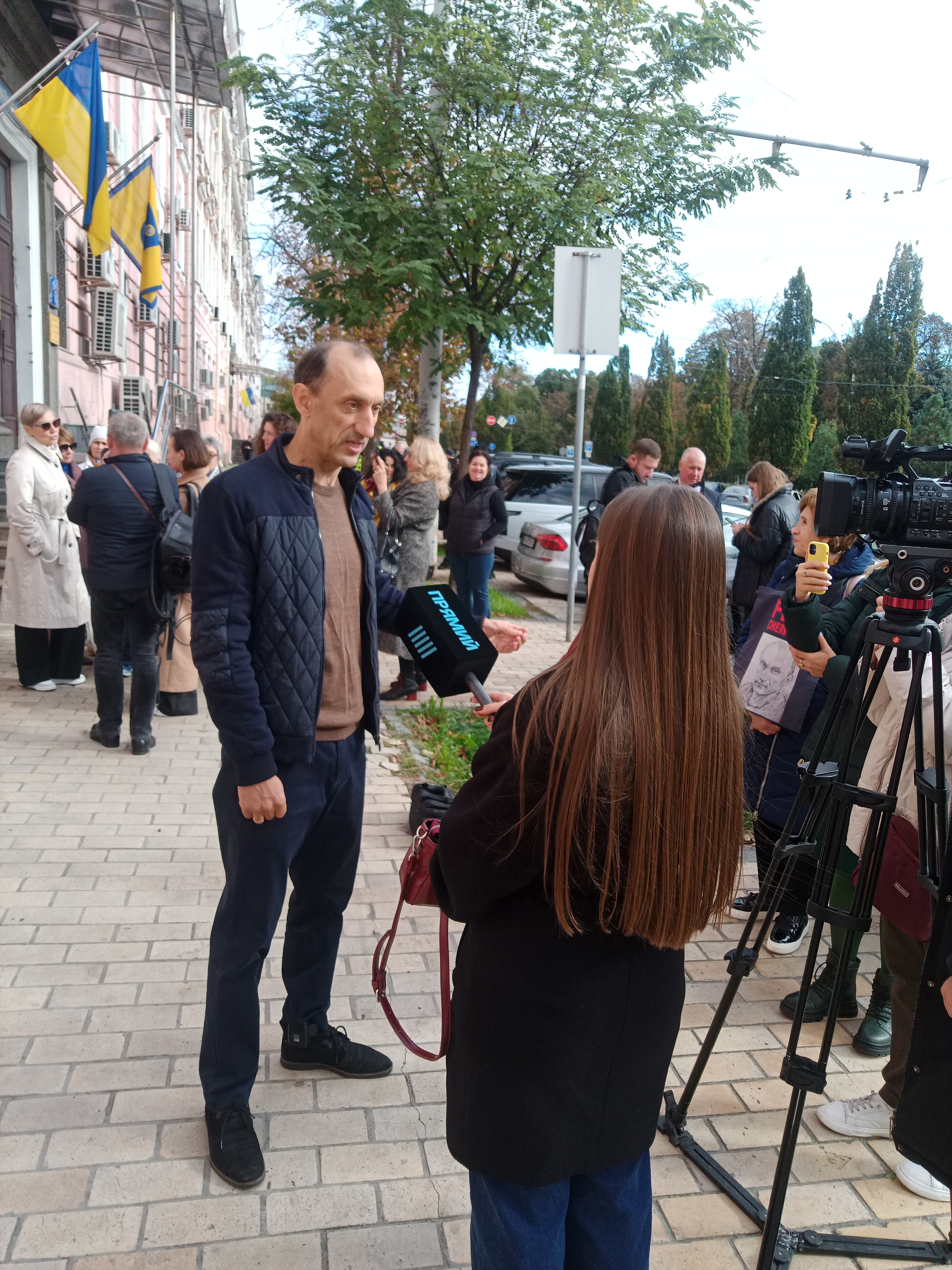
Roman Chervinsky gives an interview near the Pechersk court. 18 October 2024

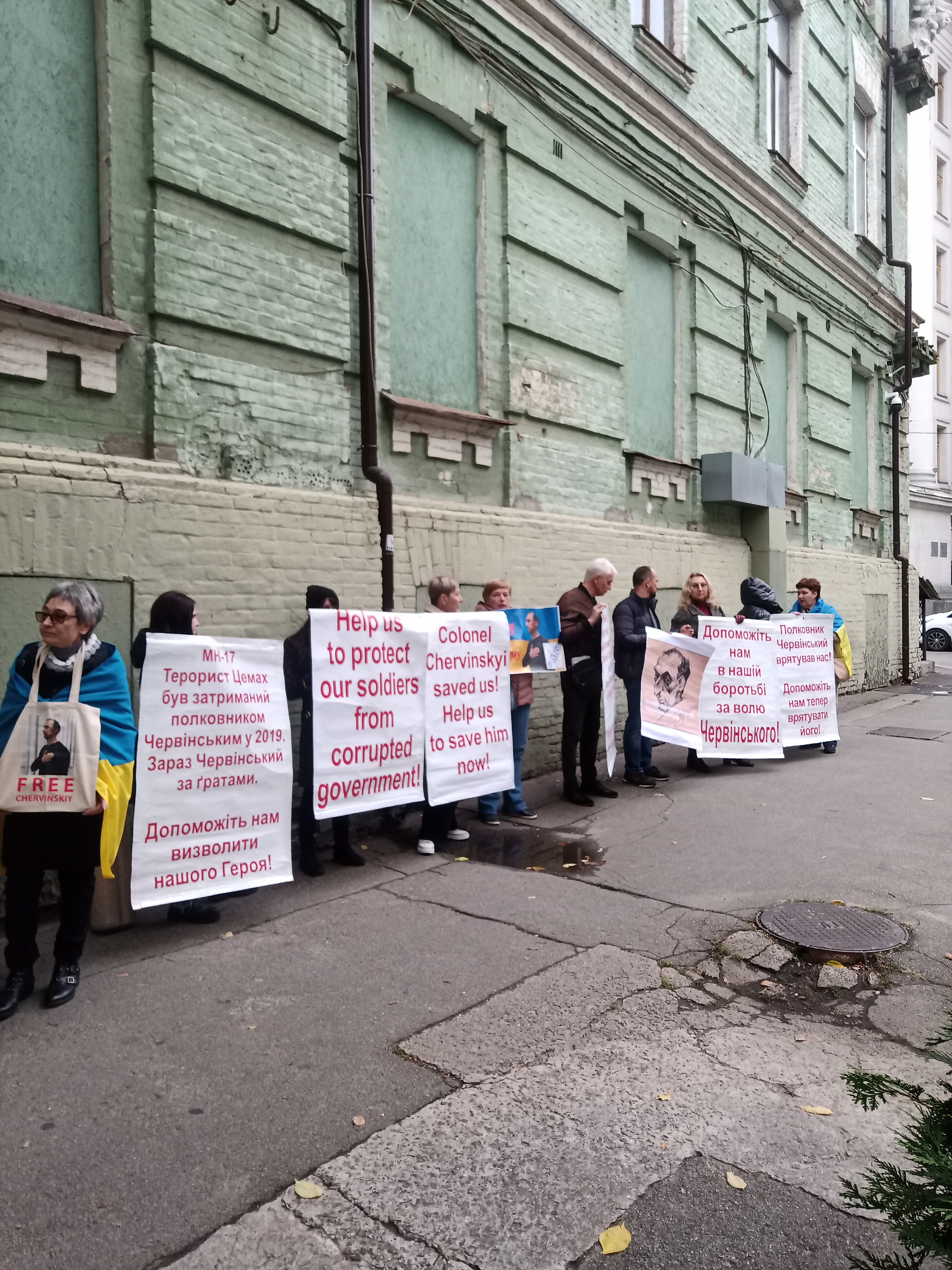
Picket in support of Roman Chervinsky in front of the British Embassy. 18 October 2024

On 24 April 2023, the SBU detained Chervinsky in the first fabricated case, the shelling of the Kanatove airfield (near the city of Kropyvnytskyi) in 2022. He was suspected of abuse of power. Since 25 April 2023, Chervinsky was arrested and held behind bars in the SBU detention center in Kyiv.

According to the SBU, at the beginning of the war, the Ukrainian military tried to recruit a Russian pilot to fly the plane to Ukraine. But the enemy fired missiles at the Ukrainian airfield where the Russian plane was waiting. Then the commander of the military unit was killed, and 17 more servicemen were injured. Chervinsky allegedly did not coordinate the operation with the "relevant state bodies." Chervinskyi and his defense denied the charges. The case was called politically motivated.

Chervinsky's lawyers stated that the for the prosecution is the news of the Russian propaganda channel "Russia-24", which states that Chervinsky informed the Russians about the location of people and equipment at the airfield. The witness interrogation protocols have disappeared from the case files, in particular, two interrogation protocols where they report circumstances that completely negate the charges against Chervinsky. The defense has challenged the prosecutors.

Chervinskyi's lawyers filed an appeal with the European Court of Human Rights and the ECHR began considering the complaint.

On 6 June 2024, approximately 50 people filed statements of readiness to take Roman Chervinskyi on bail in the Kirovohrad District Court. One of the key witnesses, Chervinskyi's immediate commander, clearly indicated that during the existence of the working group there were no facts of Roman Chervinskyi exceeding his authority, and he reported the fact that there is no causal connection between the special operation and the Russian shelling. However, the court left Chervinskyi in custody.

On 15 July 2024, the Kirovohrad Region Court of Appeal overturned the decision of the Kirovohrad District Court and changed the preventive measure from detention to a bail of 9 million 84 thousand hryvnias. On July 16, the bail was posted by the Petro Poroshenko Charitable Foundation. But Chervinskyi was released from custody only the next day.

Aleady on 18 July 2024, the Shevchenko Court of Kyiv sent Chervinsky to house arrest on a new charge, in the case of a bribe of $100,000. Chervinsky called the case falsified, it concerns the events of 2020. Lawyer Kostyantyn Globa stated that this case has been pending for several years, and the video of the alleged bribery was recorded illegally, edited and falsified. Chervinsky was informed of the suspicion in this case in December 2023.

Judge Iryna Oleksienko, who set the bail, filed a complaint with the High Council of Justice regarding interference in her professional activities. The intervention is carried out by the prosecutor with the involvement of operational units of the SBU.

On 24 September 2024, the Shevchenko Court of Kyiv ordered the State Bureau of Investigation to open criminal proceedings regarding interference in the activities of Iryna Oleksienko, a judge of the Kropyvnytskyi Court of Appeal. This court decision was never implemented.

The motion to release Chervinsky on bail was filed by Petro Poroshenko, all MPs from the European Solidarity faction, participants in the Revolution of Dignity and the war against Russia. During the court hearing, Poroshenko pointed out the lies of the prosecutors. A fight almost broke out in the courtroom, but all the motions to release him on bail were ignored by the court. The court sent Roman Chervinsky under house arrest.

On March 19, 2025, in the case of Roman Chervinsky's alleged bribery, the defense filed a statement of provocation of a crime. The judge refused to consider it.

On May 16, 2025, the Kyiv Court of Appeal considered an appeal against the notification of suspicion in the case of the shelling of the Kanatove airfield. Lawyers Globa and Yosipov emphasized the lack of grounds for declaring Chervinsky suspicious, since there is no evidence of guilt. During the lawyer's speech, the judge stated that the court would not evaluate the evidence. After that, Roman Chervinsky announced the disqualification of the entire panel of judges. Those to whom it was announced considered the disqualification and stated that there were no grounds for disqualification. The court did not grant the appeal. Lawyer Yosipov said that in the case of the shelling of the airfield, the investigator deceived the servicemen. The investigator said that they would be recognized as victims of the armed aggression of Russia, and he attached all the documents to the criminal proceedings in the case against Chervinsky. In the court session, none of the servicemen who were injured recognized themselves as victims of Chervinsky's actions. But Chervinsky's actions without victims are not a crime. There are signs of a crime in the actions of the investigator and the lawyers of the servicemen who helped him. A corresponding statement was filed about this. But both the district court of the Shevchenkivskyi district of Kyiv and the Court of Appeal of Kyiv refused to make a decision to enter information into the register of pre-trial investigations and start criminal proceedings - they refused to consider the statement of the crime.

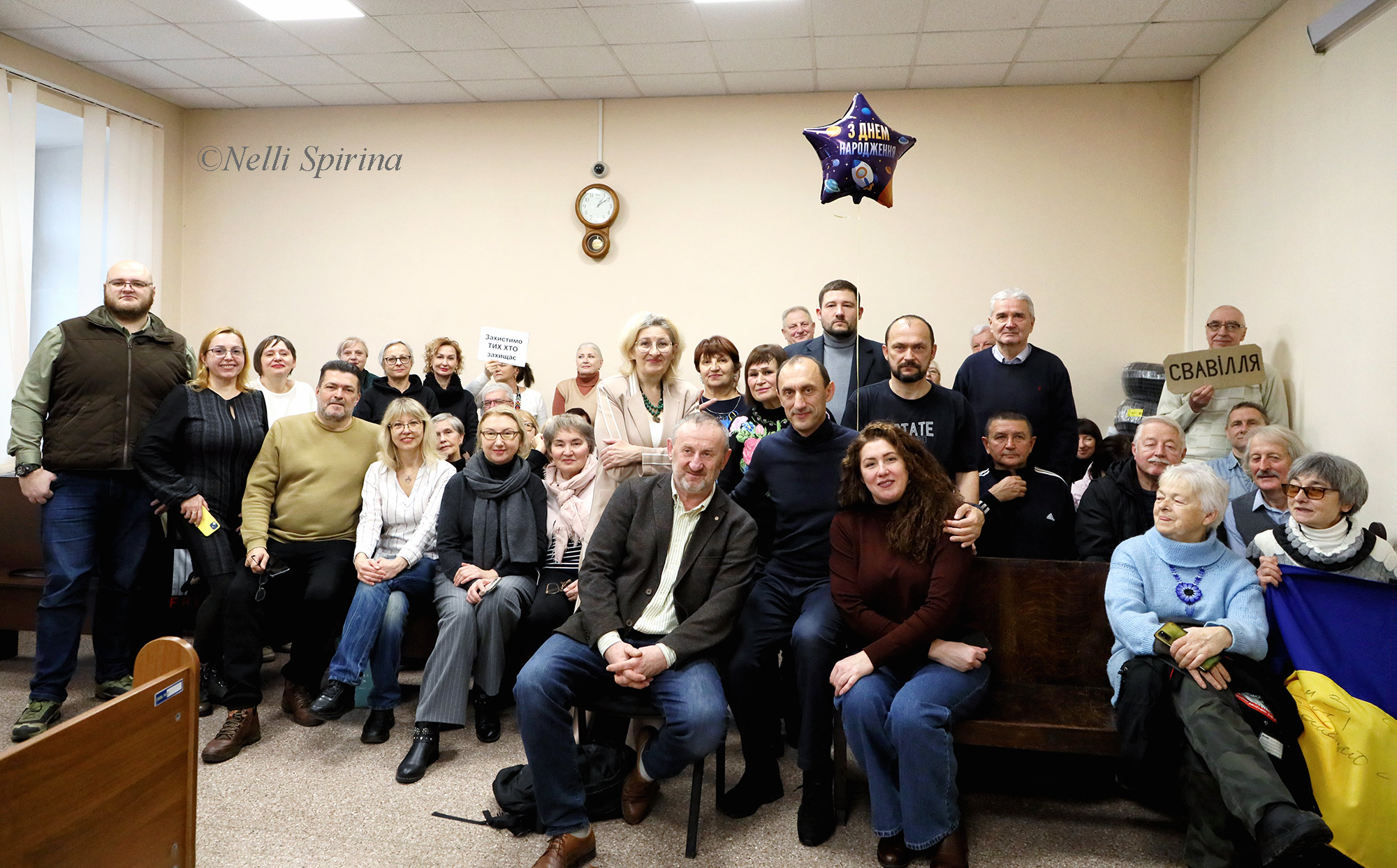
Roman Chervinsky with his wife and support group in the courtroom of the Pechersky District Court of Kyiv. December 2, 2025

On December 2, 2025, the Pecherskyi Court changed the preventive measure - from now on, house arrest will be in effect only at night. This allowed Colonel Chervinsky to officially work and exercise other constitutional rights. He returned to duty in the ranks of the Special Operations Forces of the Armed Forces of Ukraine.
