= Shelling of Donetsk, Rostov Oblast =

2014 Ukrainian bombardment

Shelling of Donetsk, Russia
- Part of the spillover of the War in Donbas
- Location of Rostov Oblast in Russia

- Shelling of Donetsk, Rostov Oblast (Rostov Oblast) Location of Donetsk in Rostov Oblast
- Location: 48°20′N 39°56′E; Donetsk
- Weapon: Shelling
- Deaths: 1 civilian
- Injuries: 2 injured
- Perpetrators: Armed Forces of Ukraine (per Russia); (Novorossiya (confederation)) Novorossiya rebels (per Ukraine)

On 13 July 2014, mortar shells fired from Ukrainian territory landed in the courtyard of a private home in the border town of Donetsk. The shelling killed one civilian and injured two others.

== Background ==
Pro-Russian protests began in the neighboring Donetsk and Luhansk regions of Ukraine in February 2014 and eventually escalated into an armed insurgency by April. The Ukrainian government launched counterattacks, and by July 2014, had retaken significant territory from the pro-Russian rebels.

On Friday, 11 July, two days before the shelling, 36–37 Ukrainian soldiers were killed in a Grad rocket bombardment. In response, Ukrainian President Petro Poroshenko announced that for "every soldier's life, the militants will pay with dozens and hundreds of their own."

== Shelling ==
Up to six mortar shells exploded on Sunday, 13 July, in Donetsk, Russia, a town of 50,000 that shares the same name as the much larger Ukrainian city and is just 1 km away from the Ukraine-Russia border. The mortar shells landed in the courtyard of a private home, killing a 46-year-old man, while injuring two others.

According to local officials, the shells were fired from Ukrainian territory. Russian officials said that the border towns near Ukraine, which Ukraine claimed were being used by rebels, were hit in the past by Ukrainian fire. A local government official said that the shelling happened around 9:20 AM.

According to the daughter of the man who was killed in the shelling, she "woke up in the middle of the night" (thus contradicting the earlier report of attack happening at 9:20 AM) and heard her younger brother scream, then she ran out of the house, and heard her father scream. After that, she and her brother went to the porch and found her father, who was killed, missing an arm.

Ukraine denied responsibility for the shelling, claiming it was a false flag attack by pro-Russian militants. The Ukrainian National Guard said it was never deployed in the region in which the shelling occurred.

== Aftermath ==
The incident increased tensions between Russia and Ukraine, with Russia vowing a "response". Russia said it would be considering "surgical strikes" to target Ukrainian military positions near the border, but that there would not be a full-scale invasion of Ukraine.

Russia has asked military attaches from eighteen countries including the four other permanent members of the UN Security Council – China, France, the United Kingdom, and the United States – to visit the scene of the shelling.

Military attaches from eleven member-states of the Organization for Security and Co-operation in Europe (OSCE) and foreign journalists have inspected the areas that came under fire from Ukraine's territory. Germany's military attache, Brigadier General Reiner Schwalb stated "Russia does not conceal the events. Our task is to understand the situation,".

== Response ==
=== States ===
- Russian Federation – Deputy Foreign Minister Grigory Karasin said in a radio interview on 13 July that the Ukrainian army is responsible for the shelling and that the incident could have "irreversible consequences". The Ukrainian chargé d'affaires in Moscow was summoned by the Russian Foreign Ministry and handed a note of protest.
  Kommersant reported on 14 July via an unnamed source close to the Kremlin that Russia is considering airstrikes against targets in Ukraine as a response to the shelling of Russian territory. "Our patience is not limitless," the source was quoted as saying, adding that Russia "knows exactly where they (Ukrainians) are firing from." When asked about the Kommersant report, Dmitry Peskov, spokesman for President Vladimir Putin, said: "It's nonsense, there is nothing to comment on, it's not true." Meanwhile, Deputy Speaker of the Federation Council Yevgeny Bushmin called for a military response: "We need to use precision weapons, like Israel's, to destroy those (the Ukrainians) who launched the bomb."
- Ukraine – Spokesman for the National Security and Defense Council of Ukraine Andriy Lysenko dismissed Russia's claims as "total nonsense" and denied that Ukrainian forces were behind the shelling. Lysenko suggested that the rebels could have been behind the attack in order to provoke Moscow to intervene on their behalf. President Petro Poroshenko further accused Russia of sending its army across the border and attacking Ukrainian servicemen.
- United States – State Department spokesperson Jen Psaki commented during a briefing held on 15 July on the incident. She said Russia failed to provide sufficient evidence confirming that Ukraine was indeed behind the July 13 cross-border mortar shelling.

=== Disputed entities ===
- Novorossiya – Separatists denied that they were behind the attack. DPR vice prime minister Andrey Purgin told a Moscow radio station, "We're accustomed to being blamed for all Ukrainian shellings."

== See also ==
- Outline of the Russo-Ukrainian war
- 2014 Russian cross-border shelling of Ukraine
- Attacks in Russia during the Russo-Ukrainian war (2022–present)
