= Anastasia Dmitruk =

Ukrainian poet

External videos
- Никогда мы не будем братьями!
- Це моя і твоя війна
- Небесній сотні присвячується
- Письмо соседу
- Я нам мира у Бога вымолю
- I will pray for peace (song)
- Небо падає!

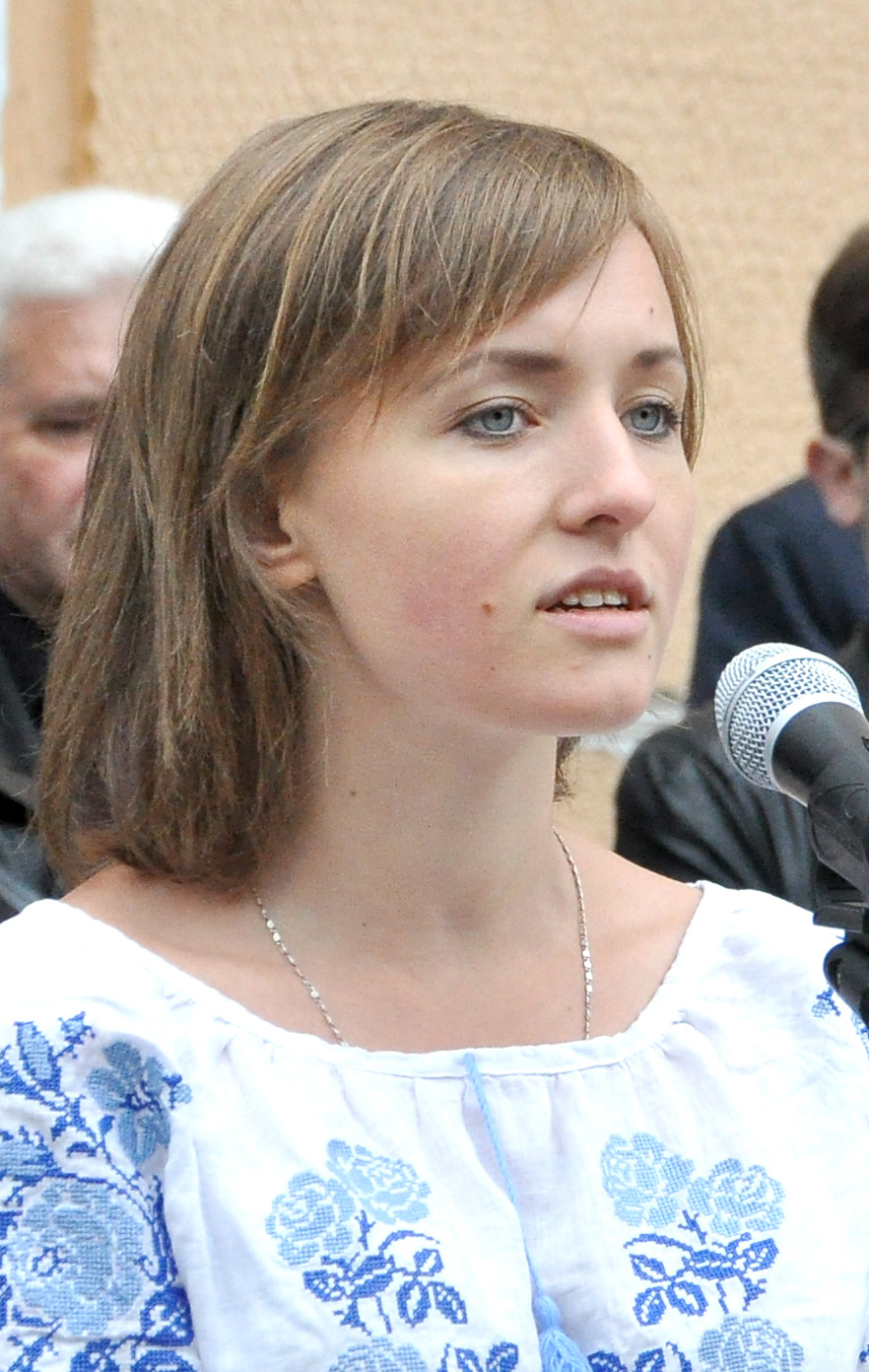
Anastasia Dmitruk

Anastasia Dmytruk (Ukrainian: Анастасія Дмитрук; born 31 January 1991 in Nizhyn) is a Ukrainian poet who writes in the Russian and Ukrainian languages. She writes poetry and has worked as an information security specialist after graduating from Kyiv Polytechnic Institute. Never ever can we be brothers, written in Russian, has become her most widely cited poem.

The poem was written in response to the Russian occupation of Crimea in 2014. The poem celebrates the 2014 Ukrainian revolution and rejects "Great Russia":

Freedom's foreign to you, unattained;
From your childhood, you've been chained.
In your home, "silence is golden" prevails,
But we're raising up Molotov cocktails.
In our hearts, blood is boiling, sizzling.
And you're kin? – you blind ones, miserly?
There's no fear in our eyes; it's effortless,
We are dangerous even weaponless.

According to literary critics, the poem might have been influenced by Russian translation of the "Britons never will be slaves!" or by Marina Tsvetayeva.

The YouTube video of Dmitruk reading her poem went viral, quickly accumulating more than a million hits. A song based on the poem was created by musicians from Klaipėda. It also quickly accumulated more than a million hits. The poem was hotly debated in the press and received many thousand responses from Russian and Ukrainian audience It became a target of many parodies, especially by Russian readers who considered the poem "Russophobic". According to Yuri Loza, the "elder Russian brothers" in the poem appear as the reincarnation of Big Brother from Nineteen Eighty-Four. It is one of the two most popular poems which were written in Ukraine immediately following the Euromaidan.
