= Battle of Novoazovsk =

2014 battle in the Donbas war

- Part of the war in Donbas and the Russo-Ukrainian War
Date	25–28 August 2014 (3 days)
Location	Novoazovsk; Donetsk Oblast, Ukraine 47°6′53″N 38°4′48″E
Result	DPR victory

Belligerents
Ukraine	Donetsk People's Republic; Russia (denied by Russia)

Commanders and leaders
(Ukraine) Valeriy Heletey; Andriy Biletsky	Alexander Zakharchenko

Units involved
Armed Forces of Ukraine: Ground Forces; Internal Affairs Ministry: National Guard; Dnipro Battalion; Azov Battalion	Donbass People's Militia; Russian Armed Forces (denied by Russia)

Casualties and losses
Unknown	Unknown

Insurgents affiliated with the Donetsk People's Republic (DPR), backed by Russian troops, opened a new front in the war in Donbas on 25 August 2014, when they attacked the Ukrainian government-controlled city of Novoazovsk in southern Donetsk. Government forces were forced to retreat from Novoazovsk, leaving DPR forces in control.

== Events ==
DPR forces stated their intention to "fight their way to the Azov Sea" on 23 August. In line with this statement, an artillery barrage was launched at the coastal city of Novoazovsk, in southern Donetsk Oblast. A column of armoured vehicles crossed into Ukraine from Russia near Novoazovsk on 25 August. There had been no insurgent formations within 30 kilometres (18 2/3 mi) of this area for many weeks. Heavy fighting took place in the village of Markyne, 7 kilometres (4 1/4 mi) from Novoazovsk. Insurgents used the village to shell Novoazovsk. A spokesman for the National Security and Defence Council of Ukraine (NSDC) said that the entrance of the column into Ukraine was an attempt "by the Russian military in the guise of Donbas fighters to open a new area of military confrontation". According to the Mariupol city website, the Dnipro and Donbas battalions repelled the attack, and the "invaders" retreated to the border. The Ukrainian military spokesman Andryi Lysenko claimed two Russian tanks destroyed and 10 members of "an intelligence-sabotage group" captured. Foreign Minister Sergei Lavrov said he had no knowledge of the incident, and suggested that reports of the incident being an incursion by Russian forces were "disinformation." Directly prior to the appearance of the column, the area was heavily shelled. The nearest insurgent artillery positions were well beyond the range of this area.

DPR insurgents, with Russian support, shelled Novoazovsk from across the Russian border on 26 August. Ukrainian border guards stationed at the Novoazovsk–Veselo–Voznesenka border-crossing showed craters that they said were caused by shelling from Russian territory. Russia denied any involvement, and said that DPR forces had been acting on their own. According to the Armed Forces of Ukraine, this shelling was an attempt to take-out Ukrainian artillery positions in the area. As the shelling occurred, smoke could be seen rising over the city, whilst many residents fled in cars and lorries. Four civilians were wounded in the shelling.

Insurgents pushed into Novoazovsk on 27 August. Whilst the Ukrainian government said they were in "total control" of Novoazovsk, town mayor Oleg Sidorkin confirmed that the insurgents had captured it. He also said that "dozens" of tanks and armoured vehicles had been used by the insurgents in their assault on the town. At least four civilians were injured by insurgent shelling. To the north, close to Starobesheve, Ukrainian forces said that they spotted a column of 100 armoured vehicles, tanks, and Grad rocket lorries that was heading south, toward Novoazovsk. They said these vehicles were marked with "white circles or triangles", similar to white armbands seen on Russian paratroopers that were captured by government forces in Ukrainian territory a few days earlier. Amidst pressure on this new third front, government forces retreated westward toward Mariupol. A statement by the NSDC later said that Novoazovsk had been captured by "Russian troops", despite earlier denials by the Ukrainian government. According to the NSDC, Ukrainian troops withdrew from Novoazovsk to save lives, and were instead preparing defences in Mariupol.

=== Russian involvement ===
Ukraine and western governments say that Russian troops either facilitated or took part in the attack on Novoazovsk. By the time that the city fell to the attackers, NATO said that there were at least 1,000 Russian soldiers operating on Ukrainian soil. One DPR commander said that his own forces took over Novoazovsk, and that he had support from "Russian volunteers". By 1 September, Russian troops seemed to have vanished from the town, which was then being guarded by DPR insurgents. Despite this, some locals said that there were "little green men" outside the town, referencing a term used during the events that led to the annexation of Crimea by Russia to refer to the unmarked Russian forces that took over the peninsula in February 2014. As the battle was ongoing in Novoazovsk, the NSDC released a video showing a T-72 tank in Novoazovsk. The government of Ukraine said that this was proof of the presence of Russian troops on Ukrainian soil.

== See also ==
- Outline of the Russo-Ukrainian War
