= Never Ever Can We Be Brothers =

External media
- Никогда мы не будем братьями! (poem) on YouTube
- Никогда мы не будем братьями! (song) on YouTube

“Never Ever Can We Be Brothers” (Russian: «Никогда мы не будем братьями») is a pro-Euromaidan poem written in Russian by Anastasia Dmitruk in response to the Russian occupation of Crimea in 2014. The poem celebrates the 2014 Ukrainian revolution and rejects "Great Russia":

...
Freedom’s foreign to you, unattained;
From your childhood, you’ve been chained.
In your home, “silence is golden” prevails,
But we’re raising up Molotov cocktails.
In our hearts, blood is boiling, sizzling.
And you’re kin? – you blind ones, miserly?
There’s no fear in our eyes; it’s effortless,
We are dangerous even weaponless...

A YouTube video of Dmitruk reading her poem went viral, quickly accumulating more than a million views. A song based on the poem was created by Lithuanian musicians from Klaipėda. It also quickly accumulated more than a million views. The poem was hotly debated in the press and received many thousands of responses from Russians and Ukrainians. According to Yuri Loza, the "elder Russian brothers" in the poem appear as the reincarnation of Big Brother from Nineteen Eighty-Four. It is one of the two most popular poems which were written in Ukraine immediately following the Euromaidan. According to literary critics, the poem might have been influenced by Russian translation of the "Britons never will be slaves!".
