= Ivano-Frankivsk strikes (2022–present) =

Bombing of ukraine

- Part of the Russo-Ukrainian war (2022–present)
Date	24 February 2022 – now (4 years, 8 months, 2 weeks and 2 days)
Location	Ivano-Frankivsk, Ivano-Frankivsk Oblast, Ukraine

Belligerents
Ukraine	Russia

Units involved
Armed Forces of Ukraine	Armed Forces of the Russian Federation

Casualties and losses
5 wounded 6 MIG-29s destroyed	None

The strikes on Ivano-Frankivsk began on 24 February 2022, the first day of Russia's invasion of Ukraine, with a series of missile strikes from Russia as well as from territory of Belarus.

== 2022 strikes ==
=== February ===
On 24 February, Russian troops launched a missile attack on the military airfield in Ivano-Frankivsk, as a result of which a warehouse with fuel and lubricants caught fire. According to the data provided by military personnel, one person died. At the same time, Russian troops launched a missile attack on the military airfield in the village of Kornych and the Kolomyia district, where, according to preliminary data, three servicemen and two civilian employees of the airfield were wounded.

On 26 February, a Russian missile attack on Ivano-Frankivsk International Airport destroyed six MiG-29s.

=== March ===
On 11 March, Russian forces launched a missile attack on the civilian airport of Ivano-Frankivsk, and during the attack, the air-raid siren did not go off. As a result of shelling, the infrastructure of the airport was significantly damaged. According to preliminary data, there were no casualties during this shelling. The Mayor of Ivano-Frankivsk, Ruslan Martsinkiv, recommended to residents of the city who live near the airport to move to a safer place during the war, as there is a possibility of repeated shelling of the city.

On 13 March, Russian troops shelled Ivano-Frankivsk for the third time, the city's airport was hit again, as a result of which its infrastructure was almost completely destroyed. The strike was carried out at 6:30 a.m., just after the end of the nationwide air alert. According to the authorities of the city and region, there were no casualties this time either.

According to the report of Lviv City Council member Andrian Gutnyk, published on 18 April, the missile attack on Lviv, which took place on 18 March, was initially planned for Ivano-Frankivsk, and only at the last moment were the missiles directed to Lviv.

=== May ===
On 5 May, the mayor of Ivano-Frankivsk, Ruslan Martsinkiv, said that he had received information about a possible rocket attack on the city in the period from 7 to 9 May, so the mayor called on the city's residents to leave its borders for these three days. however, this information was not confirmed later, and there was no rocket attack on the city during those days.

=== October ===
On 19 October, Russian troops launched a missile attack on Burshtyn TPP. Four missiles hit but no one was injured.
