= Russian use of mobile crematoriums in Ukraine =

There have been multiple reports of Russian mobile crematoriums operating with their forces in the Russo-Ukrainian war, to cremate the bodies of both Russian soldiers and Ukrainian civilians.

== 2014–2022 ==
Reports on the use of mobile crematoriums by Russian forces first appeared in 2015 in the Russo-Ukrainian War. U.S. House Armed Services Committee Chairman Mac Thornberry told Bloomberg in 2015 that "[t]he Russians are trying to hide their casualties by taking mobile crematoriums with them [...] They are trying to hide not only from the world but from the Russian people their involvement", and that U.S. Representative Seth Moulton, who traveled to Ukraine in 2015, confirmed the claims. Thornberry and Moulton told Bloomberg that the reports were supported by U.S. and other intelligence in addition to Ukrainian intelligence. The then-head of the Ukrainian security agency, Valentyn Nalyvaichenko, had also at the time reported seven mobile crematoriums having entered militant-held areas of Ukraine in January 2015, and said "[e]ach of these crematoriums burns 8–10 bodies per day."

Just before the start of the full-scale Russian invasion, the British Ministry of Defense released images of what it said were vehicle-mounted crematoriums. The British Secretary of State for Defence Ben Wallace suggested to The Daily Telegraph that they would be used to hide evidence of battlefield casualties, describing them as "chilling". He also suggested it may have been developed to avoid domestic criticism of the war arising from any large visible casualties, stating "[i]t's a very chilling side effect of how the Russians view their forces and for those of you who served, and being a soldier, knowing that trundling behind you is a way to evaporate you if you are killed in battle probably says everything you need to know about the Russian regime." The report subsequently caused The Telegraph to become blocked in Russia. The pre-war footage released by the British Ministry of Defense showed text stating the equipment was made by a St. Petersburg company called Tourmaline, describing itself as 'The Russian Incinerator Company', and it being created for the destruction of hazardous biological waste. According to Snopes the mobile devices for disposing any biological waste, including human bodies and animals were manufactured by the company already in August 2013.

== Full-scale Russian invasion ==
On 3 March 2022, Ukrainian President Volodymyr Zelenskyy told reporters that "[t]he Russian people dying here, nobody is counting them, people dying in this war. Do you know they have brought a cremation chamber with them? They're not going to show the bodies to their families. They're not going to tell the mothers that their children died here".

On 6 April 2022, the Mariupol City Council accused Russia of using mobile crematoriums to burn the corpses of civilians to hide evidence of war crimes, writing "[k]illers cover their tracks". According to the Council, Russian authorities had "ordered the destruction of any evidence of crimes committed by its army in Mariupol" after the international outrage caused by the discovery of the Bucha atrocities. Mariupol Mayor Vadym Boychenko told the Associated Press in April that "[m]obile crematoriums have arrived in the form of trucks: You open it, and there is a pipe inside and these bodies are burned", stating he had several sources telling of methodical burning of corpses by Russian forces. Boychenko stated at that time the civilian death toll could surpass 20,000, accusing Russian forces of blocking humanitarian convoys to conceal the extent of casualties.

Through 2023 and 2024, Ukrainian officials continued describing Russian use of mobile crematoriums in occupied and frontline territories, such as in Chernihiv Oblast; Novoaidar, Luhansk Oblast; Krazna Zorka, Crimea; Tokmak, Zaporizhzhia Oblast; and Avdiivka, Donetsk Oblast.
