= 2022 evacuation of the Donetsk People's Republic and the Luhansk People's Republic =

The 2022 evacuation of the Donetsk People's Republic and the Luhansk People's Republic refers to mass evacuation of the residents of the self-proclaimed Donetsk People's Republic (DPR) and Luhansk People's Republic (LPR) to the Russian Federation starting in February 2022.

== Evacuation ==
On 18 February 2022, the leader of the DPR, Denis Pushilin, announced that DPR inhabitants were to evacuate to Russia due to the threat of attack from Ukraine. Later, Leonid Pasechnik, head of the LPR, did the same, and announced that the LPR civilian population was to be evacuated to Russia. However, Ukraine denied the allegations of starting an offensive against the two republics. The first train for the evacuation departed to Russia on 19 February. According to the Ministry of Emergency Situations in Russia, 50,000 evacuees from the Donbas had arrived in Russia in the first two days since the announcement of the evacuation.

Ukrainian authorities reported that most people in Donetsk and Luhansk did not leave their homes. Some citizens evacuated out of fear of the Russian authorities, rather than allegations of a Ukrainian offensive. Dmitry Peskov, the press secretary to Russian president Vladimir Putin, said that he had no information of what was happening in the DPR.

== See also ==
- Russian filtration camps of Ukrainians
- War crimes in the 2022 Russian invasion of Ukraine § Abduction and deportation
