= Crimean consensus =

Social period in Russia, 2014 to 2018

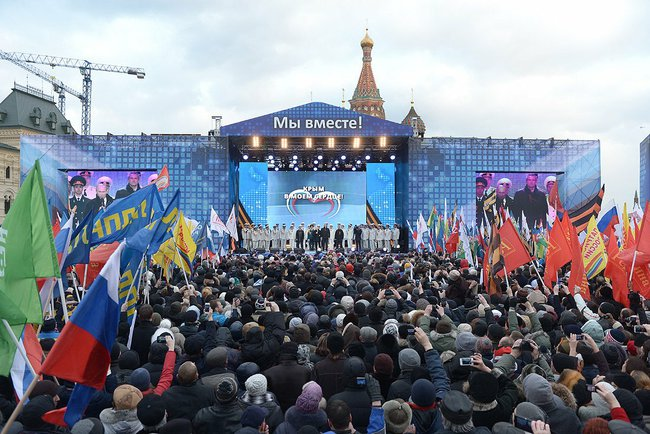
A pro-Putin rally in Russia in support of the Crimean annexation, March 2014

Crimean consensus (Russian: Крымский консенсус) was a social period in Russia during which the feeling of solidarity and unity in the society was observed after the 2014 annexation of Crimea. During it the support of the Russian president Vladimir Putin has risen and 'round the flag' effect was observed in the Russian population. 83-89% of Russians supported the annexation of Crimea as of March 2017, depending to the wording of the question. According to various political analysts the effect of "Crimean consesus" ended in 2018.

== Effect ==
The annexation of Crimea has caused a rallying effect and a surge in patriotic sentiment in Russia. The Russian population began to perceive their country as a "great power" again, as writes psychologist Anastasia Nikolskaya and economist Mikhail Dmitriev.

According to sociologist Alexei Levinson, in the narrative of Russia’s "return" to greatness, the previous 25 years of Russian history are seen as a "disease", and the annexation of Crimea "heals the trauma" of the fall of the Soviet Union, returning the situation to normal, to the return of the geopolitical confrontation with the United States as in the days of the Cold War.

As a result of this effect, pro-annexation and pro-Putin rallies started to occur in all big Russian cities, receiving considerable attention on Russian state TV and official approval from the government. Particularly in Moscow on 2 March 2014, an estimated 27 thousand people rallied in support of the Russian government's decision to intervene in Ukraine.

=== Russian population ===
Trust in the Russian state media has increased, and the absolute majority of the Russian population praised and supported Putin and both his domestic and foreign political actions.

The "Crimean Consensus" affected all social strata and remained resistant to the external and internal "destructive" factors involving Russia, such as sanctions, falling oil prices, Ruble devaluation and declining incomes. At the same time, there was a shift in priorities, basic materialistic demands increased(which was partly due to the fall in income during the 2015-2016 crisis) and the demand for political and civil liberties and the rule of law decreased.

=== Russian elite ===
As political scientist Alexander Shatilov writes, most of the Russian ruling elite took the annexation of Crimea as a "given", and some even sincerely supported it - especially those in the "patriotic" part of it, but also some moderate or even systemically liberal representatives of the elite supported the annexation. Others who opposed annexation still saw Crimea as a part of Russia, including Alexey Navalny.

Representatives of the creative elite who supported the annexation signed a petition on the website of the Ministry of Culture "Cultural figures of Russia are in support of the President’s position on Ukraine and Crimea":

В дни, когда решается судьба Крыма и наших соотечественников, деятели культуры России не могут быть равнодушными наблюдателями с холодным сердцем. Наша общая история и общие корни, наша культура и её духовные истоки, наши фундаментальные ценности и язык объединили нас навсегда. Мы хотим, чтобы общность наших народов и наших культур имела прочное будущее. Вот почему мы твёрдо заявляем о поддержке позиции президента Российской Федерации по Украине и Крыму.

Translation:

In the days when the fate of Crimea and our compatriots is being decided, Russian cultural figures cannot be indifferent observers with cold hearts. Our common history and common roots, our culture and its spiritual origins, our fundamental values and language have united us forever. We want the community of our peoples and our cultures to have a strong future. That is why we firmly declare our support for the position of the President of the Russian Federation on Ukraine and Crimea.

Some of them considered the annexation of Crimea to be "the restoration of historical justice" and hoped for a continuation, others condemned the Euromaidan, and others feared radical far-right forces coming to power in Ukraine.

According to Shatilov, subsequently the realization of the impossibility of reaching any agreements with the West on the Crimean issue and the broader geopolitical context led to the fact that the more pro-Western parts of the Russian elite switched to "defensive" positions.

=== Sociology ===
The annexation of Crimea has left a big effect in the Russian society. Levada polling center has conducted various sociological surveys and questionaries among Russians regarding the Crimean annexation and people's support in the government. The results are as noted below.

Question	Period		Source
Crimea should be...	March 2014, %	August 2014, %	
a part of Russia	64	73	
a part of Ukraine	14	4	
an independent state	11	15	
No answer/difficult to say	10	8	

Period		Question			Source
Year	Month	Things go in the right direction, %	Things go in the wrong direction, %	No answer/difficult to say, %	Source
2017	May	56	28	16	
2016	May	49	33	18	
2015	May	60	23	17	
2014	May	60	23	17	
2014	April	58	26	16	
2014	21-24 March	60	26	15	
2014	7-10 March	51	30	18	
2014	February	47	37	16	
2014	January	43	41	17	
2013	May	40	40	20	
2003	May	35	51	14	
1993	March	22	48	30	

As of March 2017, 83-89% of Russians supported the annexation of Crimea by Russia (depending on the wording of the question), while 8-13% did not support it. And although the question of whether the annexation of Crimea brought more benefit or harm gives a less clear result (64% versus 19), no more than 12% are ready to return the peninsula to Ukraine, and 83% are categorically against it.

== Opposition to the Crimean consensus ==
Not all Russians were affected by the Crimean consensus. Another part of the creative elite condemned the annexation and signed the appeal "Against the war, against the self-isolation of Russia, against the restoration of totalitarianism". Among the famous signatories are human rights activists (Lyudmila Alekseeva, Svetlana Gannushkina, Sergei Kovalev), writers (Andrei Bitov, Vladimir Voinovich, Viktor Erofeev), filmmakers (Mikhail Efremov, Eldar Ryazanov, Natalya Fateeva, Liya Akhedzhakova), musicians (Andrei Makarevich, Veronika Dolina, Elena Kamburova) and others.

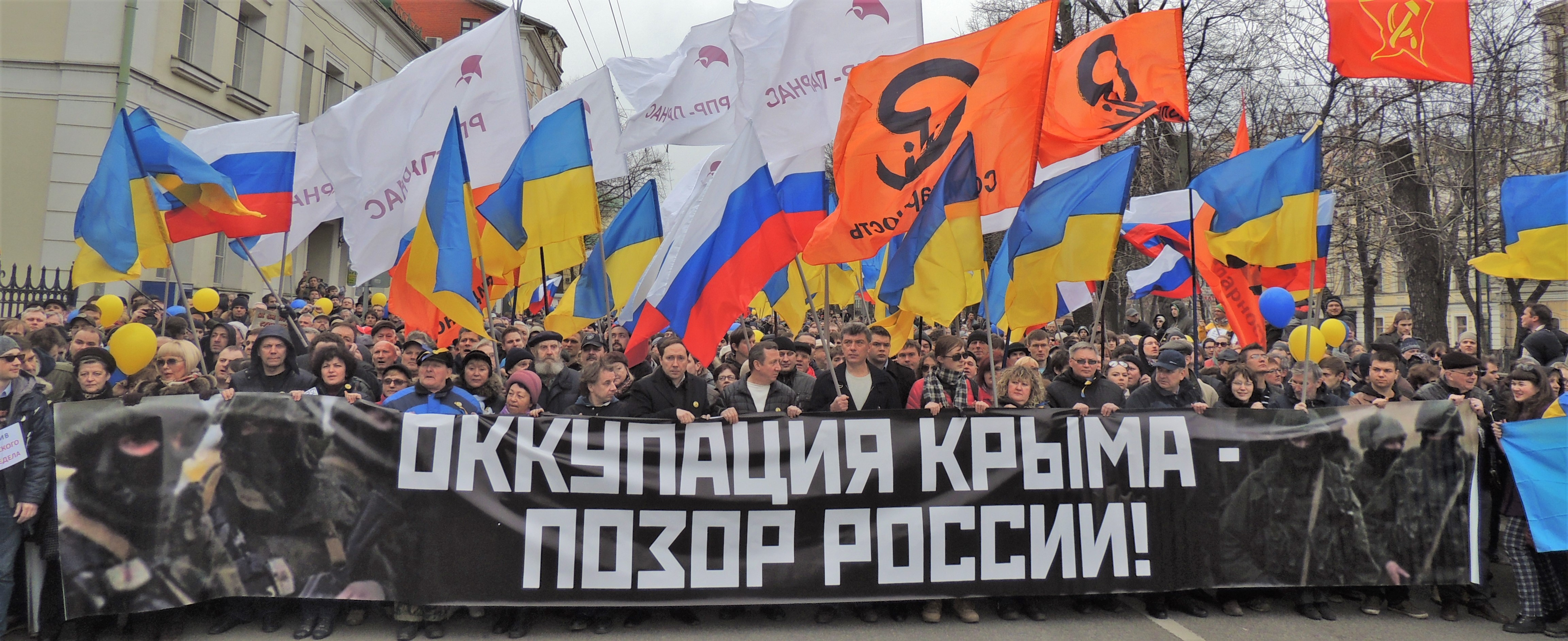
March of Peace in Moscow against the Crimean annexation, showing slogan "Occupation of Crimea is a shame of Russia". March 2014

The deputy head of Levada Center Denis Volkov says that even some of those who consider the decision to annex Crimea to be a mistake are against returning it to Ukraine. Some motivate their opinion by the fact that it would be dishonest towards the Crimeans; "blocks the possibility of any talk about the return of Crimea to Ukraine" and the fact that it would be a "loss of face" or a "concession to external pressures".

The share of people who consider the annexation of Crimea a "problem", "shame", "failure of foreign policy" or "mistake", ranges from 5 to 20% of the population, depending on the wording of the question. This share is relatively higher among opposition supporters, Moscow residents, and people focused on expanding contacts outside Russia. But even in these groups opponents of the annexation of Crimea are a minority, according to Volkova. Opponents usually justify their position by the fact that the annexation of Crimea led to an increase in budget expenditures and a deterioration in relations with developed countries, or that it started to "transform Russia into a rogue country".

== The end of Crimean consesnus ==
According to Nikolskaya and Dmitriev, by the presidential elections of March 18, 2018, signs of erosion of the Crimean Consensus became "clearly visible". The results of sociological studies of that time showed a rise in a demand for change, social justice and a peaceful foreign policy, and a surge in civic activity. At the same time, a gap has emerged between the demands of the elites and the population.

Levinson notes that during the World Football Championship that took place in June to July 2018, "fraternization suddenly began on the streets of Russian cities with foreigners who had come to the World Cup. Polls have recorded a sharp warming of attitudes towards America and the West". At the same time, it was announced that the retirement age in Russia would be raised and, according to Levinson, "the responsibility for which [Putin], was hesitating, nevertheless took upon himself and ruined everything" – thus the Crimean Consensus approached end.

The head of the Levada center Denis Volkov believes that "the first shifts in public opinion appeared by the end of 2015, as the confrontation with the West weakened," and "the announcement of the pension reform dealt a serious blow to the image of the Russian government. The effect of this decision is not limited to a simple drop in ratings; in parallel with this, the structure of support for the regime began to change, and strong differentiation appeared in the views of various segments of the population".
