= Reparations from Russia after the Russo-Ukrainian war =

Reparations from Russia after the Russo-Ukrainian War is a full or partial compensation (under the peace treaty or other international acts) by Russia for the damage caused to Ukraine as a result of the annexation of Crimea, the war in eastern Ukraine and the Russian invasion of Ukraine. President of Ukraine Volodymyr Zelenskyy demanded such compensation as a form of war reparations on 3 March 2022. Russia has not made any indication that they will accede to it.

== History ==
The issue of compensation by Russia for the losses caused to Ukraine as a result of the annexation of Crimea and the war in Donbas that began in 2014 has been discussed from the very beginning. In particular, in November 2019, the Ukrainian Minister of Infrastructure Vladyslav Krykliy noted that Russia would be forced to pay war reparations to Ukraine for military aggression in the Donbas.

Russia has consistently ruled out discussing this issue. Dmitry Peskov, a spokesman for Russian President Vladimir Putin, called Krykliy's statement a "failure" and suggested not forgetting "where Donbas is" and "who started the war in Donbas".

For the first time, the issue was officially enshrined at the state level in Ukraine in June 2021 in the Strategy of Ukraine's Foreign Policy adopted by the Cabinet of Ministers of Ukraine. The document stipulates that Ukraine, in its foreign policy in the Russian direction, will seek an end to the armed conflict and the return of the temporarily occupied territories.

The obvious conditions for reviewing relations with the Russian Federation and moving from confrontation to "peaceful coexistence" should be the cessation of Russia's aggression against Ukraine and the return of the temporarily occupied territories, compensation, and other forms of reparation for damage caused to Ukraine by the temporary occupation practices of interference in the internal affairs of Ukraine
— Excerpt from the Strategy of Foreign Policy of Ukraine

On 3 March 2022, the President of Ukraine Volodymyr Zelenskyy demanded that Russia restore all the damaged infrastructure to Ukraine during hostilities, during the payment of reparations and contributions.

We will restore every house, every street, every city. And we say to Russia: teach us the words "reparations" and "contributions". You will repay everything you did against Ukraine. In full. And we will not forget those who died, — said the President of Ukraine Volodymyr Zelenskyy.

On 14 November 2022, the General Assembly of UN adopted a resolution calling on Russia to pay reparations for the destruction caused by its war of aggression. Ninety-four countries voted in favor of the resolution and 14 against it, while 73 abstained. Belarus, Bahamas, the Central African Republic, China, Cuba, North Korea, Eritrea, Ethiopia, Iran, Mali, Nicaragua, Russia, Syria, and Zimbabwe voted against it.

== Amount of losses ==
According to the chairman of the Committee of Economists of Ukraine Andriy Novak, with the beginning of the Russian aggression, Ukraine lost up to 20% of GDP at once. Thus, the GDP in 2013 amounted to 183 billion dollars. Accordingly, since then, the state has received less than $4 billion in foreign direct investment each year.

Moreover, the total losses will be much higher. After all, it includes losses from the destruction of infrastructure and can be counted only after the deoccupation of the entire territory of Ukraine.

The IMF believes that economic losses for Ukraine are already significant in addition to human casualties. The country will face substantial costs in rebuilding and rebuilding infrastructure destroyed during the war: seaports and airports have been closed and damaged, and many roads and bridges have been destroyed. Although it is challenging to assess the need for funding at this stage.

According to KSE data received from volunteers, as of 10 March 2022, at least 200 educational institutions, 30 health care facilities, 8 churches, 1,600 residential buildings, 19 office buildings, 23 factories and their warehouses, and 12 airports, 5 TPPs and HPPs were damaged or destroyed.

In addition, more than 15,000 km of roads, 5,000 km of railways, and 350 bridges were destroyed or disabled. Ukraine has launched the "Russia Will Pay" project, which collects data on facilities destroyed by the occupiers. The data is used in international courts against Russia for compensation.

The value of damaged or destroyed objects, according to preliminary estimates of the CSE, in the event of their destruction can be up to ₴1.5 trillion or US$54.3 billion.

== International action ==
On 19 May 2023, the G7 leaders issued a statement on Ukraine stating they would ensure that "Russia's sovereign assets in our jurisdictions will remain immobilized until Russia pays for the damage it has caused to Ukraine".

On 20 June 2023, the United Kingdom implemented legislation allowing it to retain or impose sanctions to promote Russia's payment of compensation to Ukraine.

== See also ==
- Confiscation of Russian central bank funds
- Reparations (transitional justice)
