= 2014 Russian cross-border shelling of Ukraine =

The Russian cross-border artillery shelling of Ukraine happened in July–September 2014 amidst the war in Donbas to prevent the defeat of the self-declared Donetsk and Luhansk People's Republics. The Russian Armed Forces performed a series of artillery strikes targeting Ukrainian troops in the Donbas region of Ukraine.

== Background ==
In late June 2014, Ukrainian forces launched a major operation to restore control of the Russo-Ukrainian border. The success of this operation threatened the very existence of Russian-supported DPR and LPR statelets.

== History ==
On 11 July 2014, a Ukrainian camp in Zelenopillya village near Ukrainian-Russian border was shelled by a modern Russian 9K51M "Tornado-G" M270 Multiple Launch Rocket System, and Ukrainian forces suffered heavy casualties. A massive and unexpected artillery attack killed 37 and wounded over 100 soldiers.

On 13 July 2014, Russia claimed mortar shells fired from Ukrainian territory landed in the courtyard of a private home in the border town of Donetsk in the Rostov Oblast of Russia. The shelling killed one civilian and injured two others. Russia said it would be considering "surgical strikes" that target Ukrainian military positions near the border, but there would not be a full-scale invasion of Ukraine.

Russian artillery shelled Ukrainian territory repeatedly during the following days. Live videos had captured Grad rockets fired from inside Russia. According to Bellingcat's investigation, they counted at least 1,353 artillery craters in just three locations alone: in Amvrosiivka city (14 July 2014), location between Dolzhanskaya-Capital mine and the village of Panchenkove (16 July to 8 August 2014), and Khmelnytskyi (25 July 2014).

On 24 July 2014, the American government stated that it had evidence that the Russian military was firing on Ukrainian territory from across the border. A spokesman for the US Department of Defence stated that there was "no question" as to Russia's involvement in the attacks on Ukrainian Armed Forces. On 27 July, U.S. officials confirmed Russia had shelled Ukrainian territory. At the time, Russian government spokesman denied these allegations. On 28 July, US State Department published satellite photos showing heavy artillery shelling Ukrainian positions from Russian territory.

The shelling had escalated at least one week prior to a Russian invasion by stealth in August 2014. According to NATO reports, the Russian military shelled Ukrainian positions across the border from mid-August, and by 22 August, Russian artillery and personnel had crossed the border into Ukraine itself.
