= Wagnergate =

Special operation of the Ukrainian special services

Wagnergate (firstly named "Avenue") was an operation by Ukrainian special services to entrap and detain mercenaries of Wagner Group, including those possibly involved in the downing of a Ukrainian IL-76 transport aircraft and the Malaysia Airlines Flight 17. According to investigation by Bellingcat and The Insider, the operation was carried out with the covert participation of the United States and Turkish Airlines. The special operation failed in July 2020 due to the postponement of its critical phase on the orders by Andriy Yermak and the alleged leakage of information from the Office of the President of Ukraine.

== Events ==
A group of Wagner's mercenaries were lured to Minsk by promising them high-paying jobs in Venezuela. A plane carrying them on a staged transport to Venezuela from Minsk would land in Kyiv where the mercenaries would be arrested, according to the plan of the operation. However, after a call from the Ukrainian President's office, the transportation was postponed for one day, purportedly to conduct planned talks with Russia. Meanwhile, the information about the stage transport was leaked, and the mercenaries were arrested in Minsk, only to be handed over back to Russia.

== Denials ==
The head of the Ukrainian Chief Directorate of Intelligence Kyrylo Budanov denied the existence of the operation, claiming that it was a fake story to discredit Ukrainian special services. Andriy Yermak, Head of the Presidential Administration, said "it looks like a well thought out and planned disinformation campaign".

== Investigation ==
On November 17, 2021, Bellingcat and The Insider published the first part of Wagnergate's investigation. It was further investigated by Christo Grozev who said that the Bellingcat group was not only investigating the case but was also going to release a documentary.
