= Yuri Loza =

Russian singer, poet, and composer (born 1954)

Yuri Loza Юрий Лоза
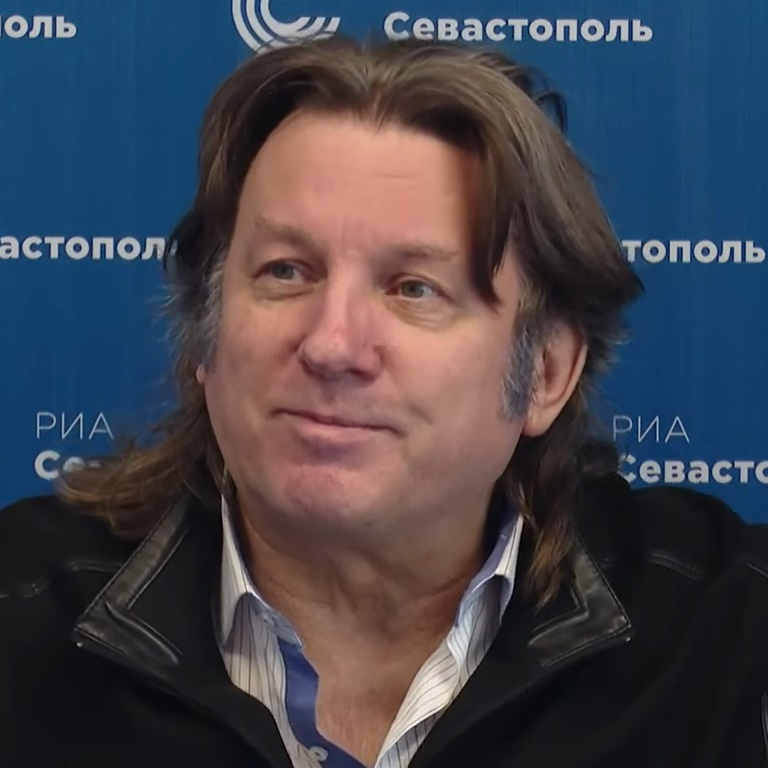
- Loza in 2016

Background information
- Born: Yuri Eduardovich Loza; 1 February 1954 (age 72); Sverdlovsk, Russian SFSR, Soviet Union (now Yekaterinburg, Russia)
- Genres: Soft rock, art rock, soviet music, Russian chanson
- Occupations: Singer; songwriter; poet
- Years active: 1983–present
- Website: web.archive.org/web/20220000000000*/http://www.lozayury.ru

Yuri Eduardovich Loza (Russian: Юрий Эдуардович Лоза; born February 1, 1954, in Sverdlovsk, Soviet Union) is a Russian singer, poet, and composer.

In 1983, he moved to Moscow with the purpose to enter the Russian Academy of Theatre Arts, but failed the entry exams and joined the rock band, Zodchiye. Soon his songs became the majority of the band's repertoire.

Since 1987, Loza has been singing solo.

Loza has been a proponent of the Flat Earth theory and has denied the occurrence of spaceflights.

In January 2023, Yuri was on the list of people who fell under the new sanctions of Ukraine.

== Discography ==
- 1983 — Путешествие в рок-н-ролл (underground tape record)
- 1984 — Огни эстрады
- 1984 — Концерт для друзей
- 1985 — Тоска
- 1985 — Огни эстрады
- 1986 — Любовь, любовь...
- 1988 — Что сказано, то сказано
- 1990 — Вся жизнь — дорога
- 1994 — Для души
- 1994 — Архив
- 1995 — Для ума...
- 1995 — Что сказано, то сказано (2CD)
- 2000 — Заповедные места
- 2001 — Любимые песни
- 2002 — Компиляция в серии «Бульвар звезд»
- 2002 — Компиляция в серии «Grand Collection»
- 2002 — Компиляция в серии «Звездная серия»
- 2004 — Запрещенные песни
- 2004 — Я умею мечтать... (2CD)
