= Women in the Russian invasion of Ukraine =

Roles of women during the Russian Invasion of Ukraine

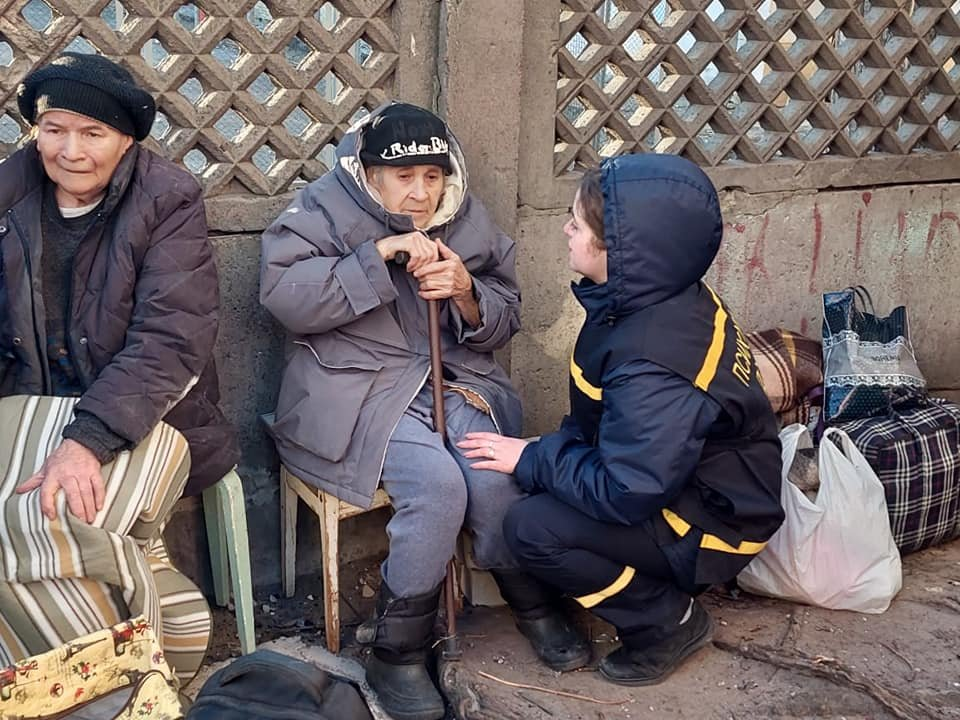
A Ukrainian police officer with two women in Kyiv on 16 March 2022

The 2022 Russian invasion of Ukraine, that began on 24 February 2022, has had a significant impact on women across Ukraine and Russia, both as combatants and as civilians. In Ukraine, the invasion has seen a significant increase in women serving in the military as well as a significant number of women leaving the country as refugees. In Russia, women have led the anti-war movement.

First Lady of Ukraine Olena Zelenska has stated that "Our resistance, as our future victory, has taken on a particularly feminine face," and has praised Ukraine's women for serving in the military, raising their children in wartime, and providing essential services. The United Nations Entity for Gender Equality and the Empowerment of Women has called the invasion "a crisis for women and girls," stating that "from heightened trafficking and gender-based violence to the loss of crucial livelihoods and rising poverty levels, women and girls of Ukraine are facing severe impacts."

== Background ==
Since the beginning of the Russo-Ukrainian War in 2014, there has been a significant increase in women's roles in the Ukrainian military, including several positions that had previously been reserved only for men being opened up to women, resulting in the total number of women serving more than doubling. Ukrainian woman have served in the armed forces since World War I, but were only officially recognized as combat veterans with full military pensions in the Soviet era and, later, after the start of the war in Donbas in 2014.

Starting in December 2021, women in certain professions were included in draft registers. However, discrimination and harassment remain significant problems within the Ukrainian military. Ukrainian women civilians have also faced significant dangers and issues during the war. Roma women have faced particular levels of discrimination, often being refused internally displaced status and facing intense racism.

Despite long-term personnel shortages in the Russian Armed Forces ever since the 2008 Russian military reform, the Russian Ministry of Defence has made little effort to enlist women to fill the gaps, instead choosing to crack down on draft-evading men in order to increase its coverage levels from c. 70% in 2012 to c. 90–95% in 2020. As of 2010, women who did join the military mostly did so out of financial necessity (67%) rather than a professional career choice (6%). Although throughout the 2010s many women sought to join the armed forces (for example, more women applied for military universities than men), they faced systemic discrimination as women were not permitted in frontline combat roles, barred from holding ranks higher than colonel (Russian: полковник), (Note: "[T]he previous Defense Minister, Anatoly Serdyukov recommended the first woman for promotion to the rank of Major-General in June 2012, but then sacked her within a few months for alleged incompetence.") and denied jobs such as "driver, mechanic, sniper or gunner". Defence Minister Sergei Shoigu stated in May 2020 that c. 41,000 women (c. 4.26% of total active duty forces) were enlisted in the Russian Armed Forces. According to a 2020 poll conducted by the state-run Russian Public Opinion Research Center (VTsIOM), 63% of Russians, including a majority of women, said they didn't want a daughter of theirs to join the military (with 42% saying "the army is not a woman's business, the army is for men").

Globally, woman and girls face a heightened risk during wartime due to displacement and breakdowns of the normal protections in society, and sexual violence has been used as a tactic in war, terror, torture and political repression by many. Per UN Women more than 70% of women experience sex-based and gender-based violence during a crisis situation, and the Lancet Medical Journal published works found that women and girls affected by armed conflict are exposed to an increased amount of traumatic experiences.

== In the Ukrainian military ==
A significant number of women have volunteered to fight for the Ukrainian forces in response to the invasion. Mia Bloom and Sophia Moskalenko of Georgia State University have stated that "Ukrainian women have historically enjoyed independence not common in other parts of the globe" and that "Ukraine offers a unique insight into the roles that women can play in defending the nation and as leaders in their own right." In September 2022, Aljazeera stated: "There are about 50,000 women serving in the Ukrainian armed forces in combat and non-combat roles, of which about 10,000 are currently either on the front lines of the war or in jobs that could send them to the front lines, according to Ukrainian military officials. There were about 32,000 women in the military prior to the invasion."

In October 2022, the first all-female prisoner of war exchange occurred between Russia and Ukraine, with 108 Ukrainian women being returned, including 37 who had fought in the Battle of Azovstal.

=== Conscription ===
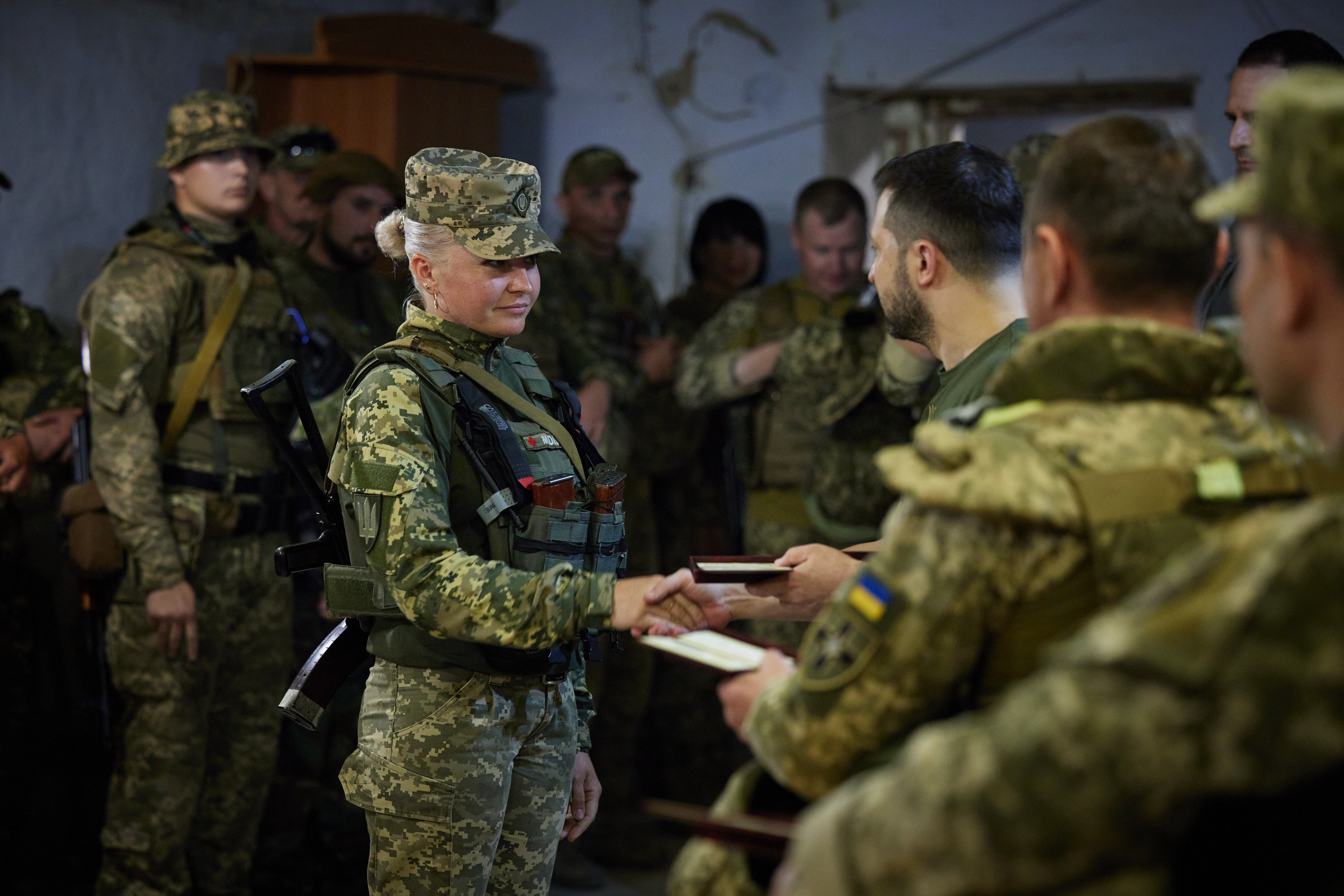
President Volodymyr Zelenskyy greets a female soldier during his working trip to Mykolaiv and Odesa Oblasts, 2022

Under the looming threat from Russia, new legislation was enacted on 21 December 2021 requiring women to register for military service, if they are deemed medically fit for military service, are between the ages of 18 and 60, and work in specific professions. In the event of a major war, this expanded reserve of women would be mobilized as part of the national reserve to serve in a broad range of military specialties. According to earlier legislation, women in certain professions were already required to register for military conscription. However, the December 2021 revision of the law regulating Ukraine's military reserves dramatically expanded the number of professions that qualify for mandatory registration with the armed forces. Now women who are librarians, journalists, musicians, veterinarians, and psychologists, among many other professions, are required to register for military service. MP Oleksandra Ustinova stated: "...in [the] current situation, the decision to educate as many people as possible to hold arms and to be ready to serve seems a good one."

Following the 24 February 2022 invasion, the Ukrainian government enforced a mobilisation order on men aged between 18 and 60 to be available for conscription as combatants. In a representative national poll on 3–4 March 2022, 59% of Ukrainian women said they were 'ready to personally participate in the armed resistance to end the Russian occupation of Ukraine.' Though Ukraine's Ministry of Defence significantly expanded the pool of Ukrainian women who are required to register for military conscription into various non-combat roles, due to the initial influx of volunteers many have not been called up for conscription, and many female volunteers who were not required to register have been put on a waiting list. One woman who spoke to reporters said she had been told; "Ok, you will be in line. But now we have too many people". Many men and women who are not in the service of the military volunteer their time and work in supporting their communities in other ways. By mid-March 2022, additional Ukrainian women, after either leaving Ukraine as a refugee or living abroad, had also returned to the country to enlist in the armed forces, or provide support services, such as helping others evacuate. According to an April 2022 survey, 69% of women intended to help by providing non-military support (delivering food, information, or ammunition) to the Ukrainian army, 65% of women were thinking of caring for injured civilians and soldiers, and 27% of women had plans to join the Ukrainian forces in various combat roles.

=== Notable individuals ===
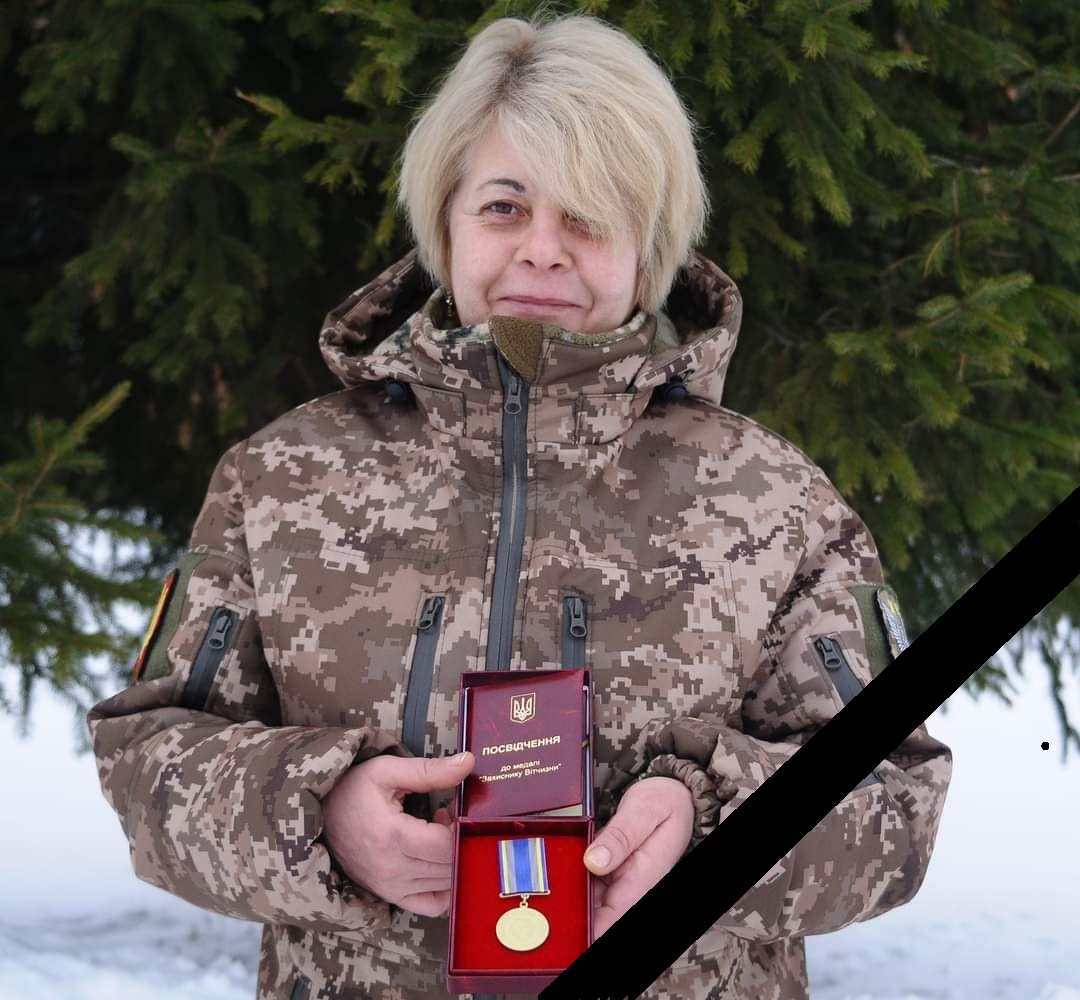
Inna Derusova with her Defender of the Motherland Medal in January 2022. She was killed in the opening days of the February 2022 invasion, becoming the first woman to be posthumously named a Hero of Ukraine.

In the opening days of the invasion, field medic Inna Derusova was said to have saved the lives of more than 10 soldiers during the Battle of Okhtyrka, before she was killed in a Russian artillery attack. On 12 March 2022, Derusova became the first woman to be posthumously awarded the highest national military title of Hero of Ukraine. During the invasion, Liubov Plaksiuk became the first woman to command an artillery division in the Ukrainian army. Tetyana Chubar, an artillery platoon commander, gained prominence on the internet after a video of her fighting during the Siege of Chernihiv went viral. Sarah Ashton-Cirillo is an American who initially worked as a journalist during the invasion before resigning to enlist as a combat medic in the Ukrainian military, later serving as a spokeswoman for the Territorial Defense Forces.

== War crimes and violence against women ==
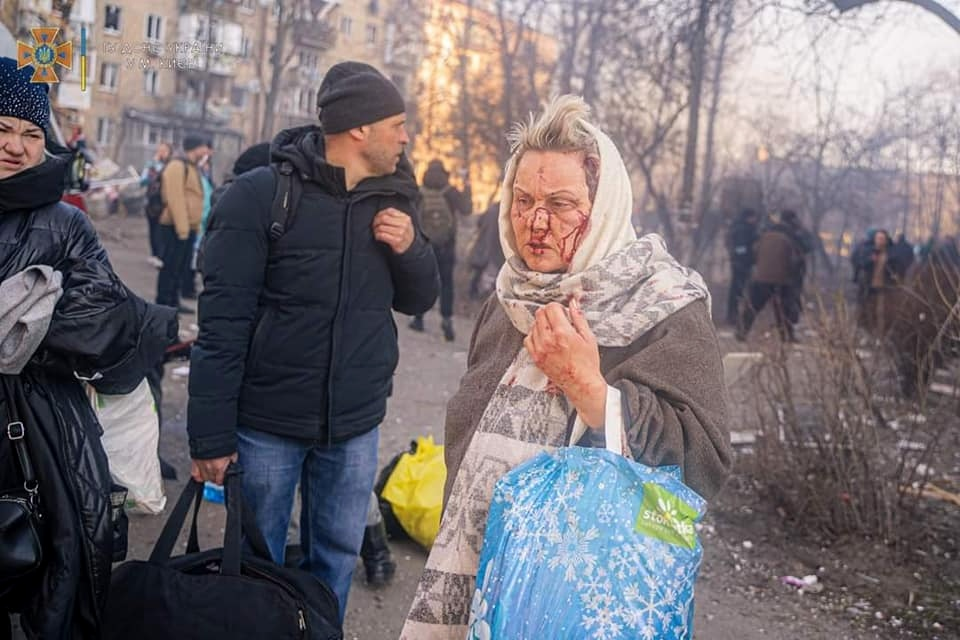
A woman with facial injuries after Russian forces attacked an apartment building in Kyiv

Even before the 2022 invasion started, women and girls living in conflict-affected eastern Ukraine bordering Russia have not felt safe – neither in public nor at home – since the war in Donbas broke out in 2014. The situation was worsened by devastating social and economic crises, access to weaponry, and trauma created by the ongoing armed conflict between the government of Ukraine and Russia-backed separatists. Reports showed women and girls especially found themselves in a desperate situation of domestic and sexual violence without protection from that violence, due to the war.

Women have been targeted with sexual violence in the invasion. Ukrainian MPs Lesia Vasylenko, Alyona Shkrum, Maria Mezentseva, and Olena Khomenko stated that most elderly women in Russian-occupied cities "were executed after being raped or took their own lives." Due to the limited communication with areas under Russian control or contested areas under heavy fighting the exact number of sexual violence cases have been difficult to track or respond to in a timely manner. The president of La Strada Ukraine; a charity supporting survivors of trafficking, domestic violence and sexual assault, stated their emergency hotline has had several calls for assistance from women and girls but due to the fighting the charity cannot help them physically. Reports of gang rapes, assaults at gunpoint and sexual violence in front of children have all been reported to Ukrainian and international authorities and law enforcement and media personnel as Russian troops have withdrawn. Female villagers were warned to make themselves look unattractive by removing jewellery, donning headscarves and dressing as old women.

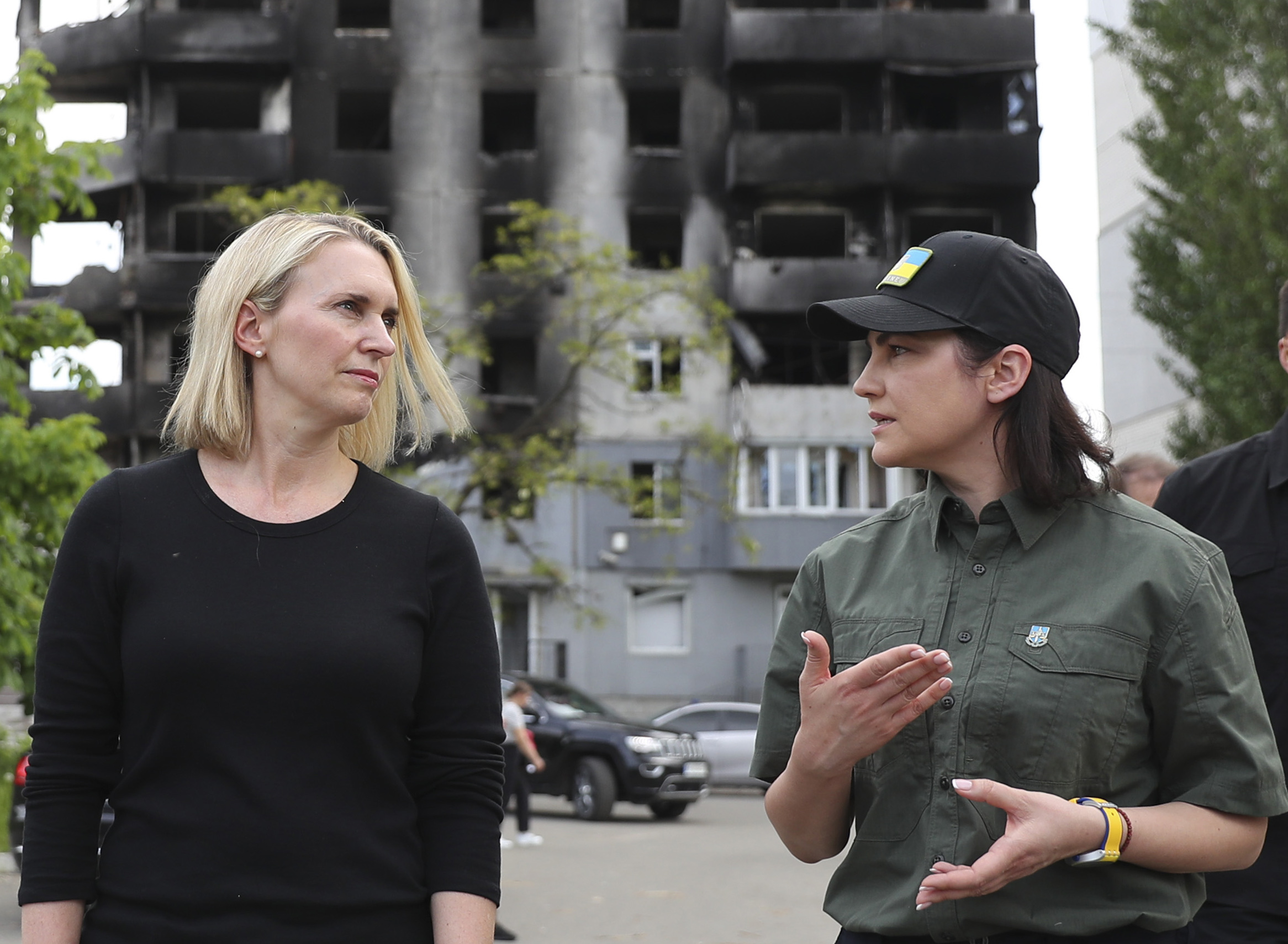
United States Ambassador to Ukraine Bridget A. Brink (left) and Prosecutor General of Ukraine Iryna Venediktova in Borodianka, following the Bombing of Borodianka

After the first official investigation into claims of sexual violence by Russia soldiers in the invasion started, The Times of London, published an account on 28 March 2022 of a woman who claimed that her husband was killed and she was raped in the village of Shevchenkove by Russian soldiers on 9 March 2022. The Mariupol city council has claimed that Russian forces have forcibly deported several thousand Ukrainian women and children from the city to Russia. The Mariupol hospital airstrike targeted a maternity ward in Mariupol. Sexual violence between the Ukrainian population has also been reported with a man from the Ukrainian territorial defense services arrested in Vinnytsia after he reportedly attempted to rape a female teacher who was trying to flee the area.

== Civilians ==
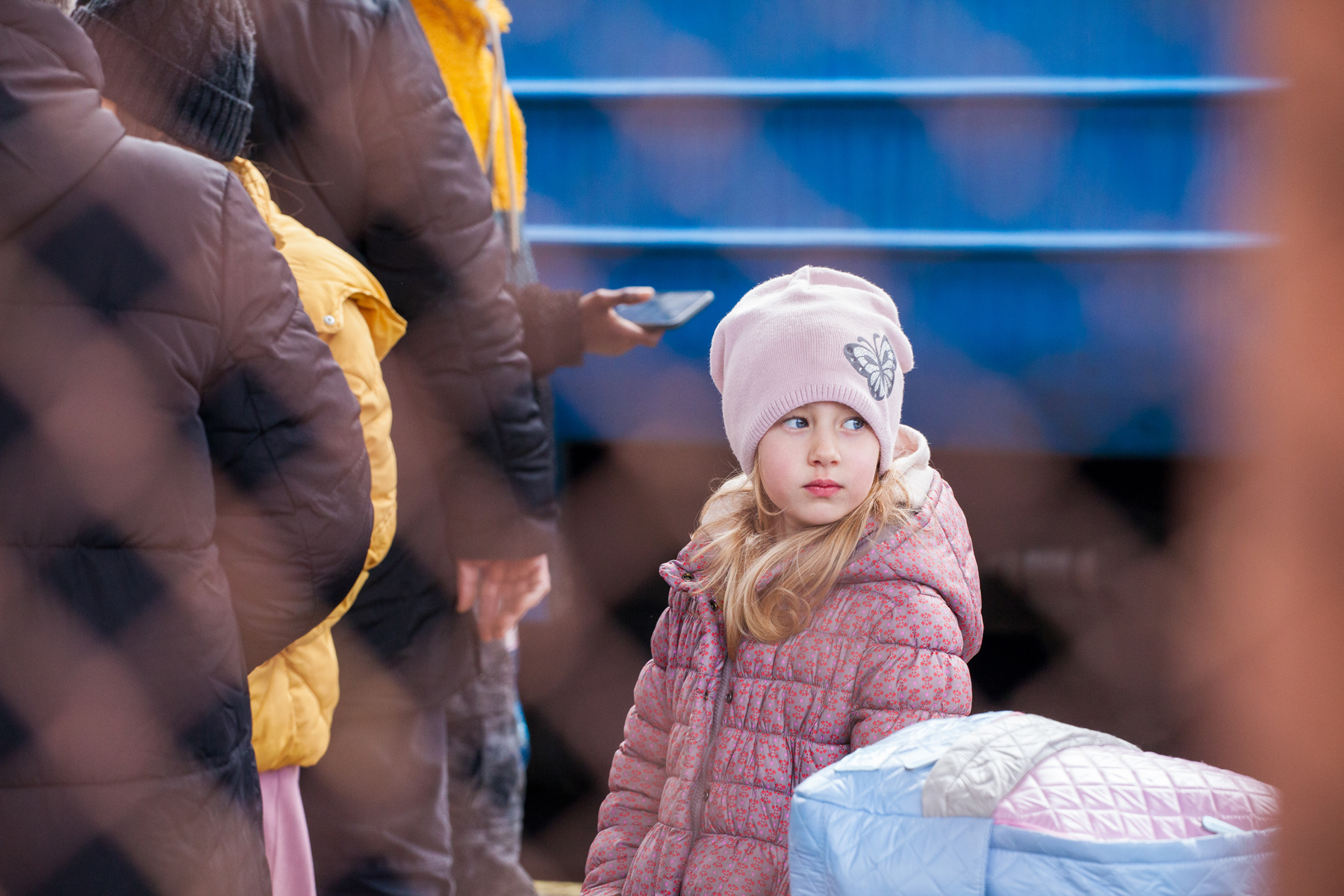
A young refugee in Przemyśl train station in Poland

=== Impact on reproductive health and rights ===
Female reproductive healthcare, including pregnancy related services in Ukraine, have faced significant disruption due to the invasion. The International Federation for Human Rights reports that the war "is having a severe impact on women and girls sexual and reproductive rights." Caroline Nokes, Chair of the British Parliament's Women and Equalities Committee, has stated that "women escaping the war have lost access to crucial healthcare. Pregnant and breastfeeding women are often unable to access vital prenatal and postnatal services or find places to give birth safely." A study using app-based technology found that women in Ukraine were less likely to report their pain after reporting increased stress at the onset of the invasion, with the latter causing long-term health impacts.

Russian forces have reportedly been attacking hospitals, launching indiscriminate attacks, and preventing humanitarian aid for children, which are clear breaches of international humanitarian law. By the second month of the war, doctors noticed a sharp rise in preterm births, with estimates of the rates doubling or tripling due to infections, lack of medical help, poor nutrition, poor living conditions, increased stress and other factors attributable to the war. One clinic in Kharkiv reported that premature births have accounted for 50% of all deliveries since the beginning of the invasion, three times the normal rate. Air raid sirens have also presented dilemmas for pregnant and newborn patients, as some women in late stages of pregnancy and newborn children cannot be moved below ground, particularly as emergency surgeries must be performed in operating theatres.

Commercial surrogacy is legal in Ukraine with an estimated 2,000 children born each year for foreign parents, with Ukrainians seeing it as a lucrative opportunity as the pay can be more than the countries average annual salary. However, due to the war surrogate mothers in Ukraine have reported significant issues caused by the invasion. Some surrogacy companies have built bunkers for the mothers and their children, while others allowed the mothers to flee the country but ordered them back for their delivery or threatened the mothers with up to 15 years in prison if they fled Ukraine. Additional issues are faced when foreign parents come to pick up their children, due to lack of documentation causing many surrogate born children being unable to leave the country legally.

=== Refugees ===
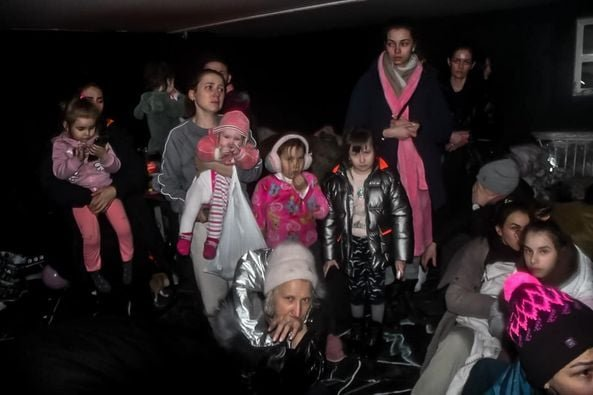
Refugee civilians in Mariupol, 12 March 2022

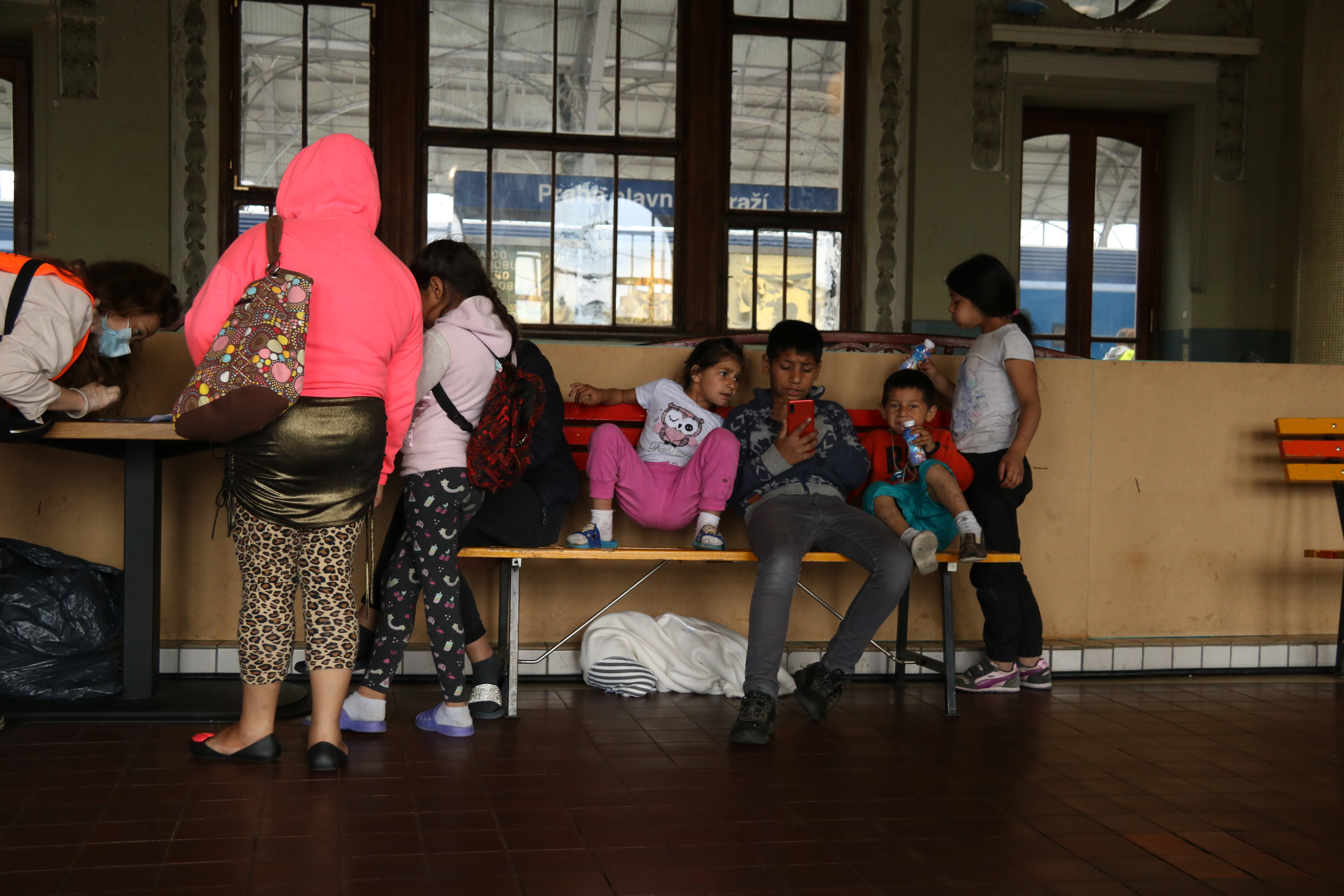
Refugees at Praha hlavní nádraží in Prague, the Czech Republic

Civilian women and children have made up a large majority of those fleeing the war. Men aged between 18 and 60 are forbidden to leave the country. Julia Gris, the only woman rabbi in Ukraine, has been forced to leave the country due to the invasion. Unaccompanied children also made up a portion of the refugees and due to initial patchy registration at border regions, many children's whereabouts are undocumented or untraceable. Attempts to lessen concerns and violence for refugees have been implemented by making volunteers show identification, document their actions and wear high visibility vests. International efforts have also been seen, such as the Israeli "With You - Wherever You Go" task force to help and support women and children refugees, with social workers, psychiatrists, psychologists and medical professions who speak Ukrainian sent to border crossings. Additionally grass root movements such as Women Take the Wheel (Kobiety za kółko) were created to transport refugees into mainland Poland. The organization is compromised entirely of women drivers for women and children refugees, with about 200 active drivers, and began after a Polish woman volunteer saw the distrust of refugees to male volunteer drivers when she arrived at the Dorohusk crossing.

Women refugees have also faced discrimination and violence once outside of Ukraine. On 22 March, Amnesty International stated that "emerging reports of gender-based violence against women and girls are of particular concern" in terms of protections of refugees in Poland and that some Polish human rights groups have "observed men in Lublin aggressively approaching women coming from Ukraine and offering them transport and accommodation." The UN Refugee program has also raised concerns about the United Kingdom's Homes for Ukraine program which does not limit hosts for refugees, and reported that it would be better for women and women with children would not be matched with single male hosts. The concerns were raised after women participating in the schemes Facebook groups set up to connect refugees with participants, reported being called derogatory comments and abuse along with explicit images from men in the group. One refugee who crossed with her children into Romania, told reporters that fake volunteers attempted to force her to travel with them to Switzerland with other women and refused to show identification. Anti-abortion movements in Poland have also targeted refugees with propaganda.

=== LGBT women ===
Transgender and non-binary people faced discrimination prior to the war, and encountered new obstacles in Ukraine as a result of the war. In 2020, prior to the invasion, there was a spike in homophobic and transphobic hate crimes in the country, with 80 documented cases. A report on these cases from the International Lesbian, Gay, Bisexual, Trans and Intersex Association indicates that in 27% of cases police reporting to the scene took no legal action and in 38% of cases police did not record a crime or open an investigation. In the three years prior to the 2022 Russian invasion of Ukraine, Ukraine had adopted new legislation and institutional frameworks relating to sex and gender-based violence, generally in line with international human rights law. Police are still reluctant to register complaints of survivors of domestic violence and widespread impunity deters many women and other victims from speaking out.

For many trans women in Ukraine, their sex assigned at birth is documented on their official identification documents, causing many to be barred from leaving the country in accordance with the law requiring men to stay in Ukraine and be available to perform military service roles, if and when they are needed. A "white ticket" for military exemption is available for trans men who were assigned female at birth on their official identification documents. Cases of trans women attempting to leave Ukraine being forced to undress and be subjected to physical examinations at checkpoints in attempts by guards to screen for individuals who are trying to avoid military service without a valid exemption have been reported. Trans women have in some cases been advised not to carry identification documents while attempting to leave Ukraine. Some who remain in Ukraine have reported that the increase in available weapons due to the invasion has led to an increase in violent threats against trans people.

A partnership between Kyiv Pride and Gay Alliance Ukraine, created a shelter for members of the LGBTQ community to stay and stock up before continuing their flight out of the country. A similar effort was seen by the LGBTQ and women's organization Insight, which created two shelters near the Polish and Romanian borders. Concerns have also been raised about the destinations for many fleeing the Russian invasion as Poland and Hungary have both been condemned by the European Union for having anti-gay laws. The laws have made some activists with Warsaw and Budapest Prides, raise concerns that the LGBT refugees would have to continue to other Western European countries to be protected by the law.

=== Education ===
The disruption in the education system leaves to mothers the task of homeschooling. Roma women are especially affected since their education was already not encouraged. The education of about 5.5 million children was affected by the war with about 22 schools being attacked daily, per the Save the Children organization and official Ukrainian figures. In early April 2022, it was reported that at least 869 education facilities or about 6% of schools in Ukraine had been damaged with about 83 completely destroyed and other classroom being used as emergency accommodation. Compounding the issue was a lack of teachers. This had been a concern prior to the invasion, but most teachers were female and became refugees elsewhere with their children.

The invasion has also seen a significant increase in Ukrainian signing up for self-defence classes, particularly motivated by reports of war crimes such as sexual violence, committed by male Russian soldiers against women and girls. One woman in Kharkiv was quoted by a newspaper stating, "Now is the time to protect my country, my house and my family." Another woman in the class was not surprised that a majority of the participants were female, as she stated, "This (is) the right place for girls. I know a lot of professional female soldiers and I believe gender in this situation doesn't matter.

== In Russia ==
=== In the Russian and DPR/LPR militaries ===
In the week prior to the 24 February 2022 invasion, the separatist regions of the Donetsk People's Republic and the Luhansk People's Republic banned men aged between 18 and 55 from leaving the regions to ensure that they remain available for conscription. The 2022 Russian mobilization began on 21 September 2022; it did not call up all men between certain ages, but all 'citizens registered with the military' (regardless of gender). The law on mobilization limits the exit from the country to citizens who are registered with the military:

Citizens who are registered with the military, from the moment of the announcement of mobilization, are prohibited from leaving their place of residence without the permission of military commissariats, federal executive bodies that have a reserve.

— The paragraph 2 of the article 21 of the Federal Law of 26 February 1997 No. 31-FZ "About mobilization preparation and mobilization in the Russian Federation"

On 12 July 2022, Russian media reported the first death of a Russian female soldier in the country's ongoing invasion of Ukraine. The soldier was Anastasia Savitskaya, a corporal from Volgograd.

During the Russo-Ukrainian war, Russian women served in a frontline assault units.

In March 2023, Russian Minister of Defence Sergei Shoigu stated that there were 1100 women involved in combat with the Russian military in Ukraine. Radio Free Europe/Radio Liberty has reported that women serving in the Russian military have faced significant sexual harassment.

=== Military families ===
Wives and mothers of Russian soldiers have faced significant issues with information being withheld on the status of those soldiers, and have organised themselves to pressure the Russian government for details and to arrange prisoner-of-war exchanges.

=== In the Russian anti-war movement ===
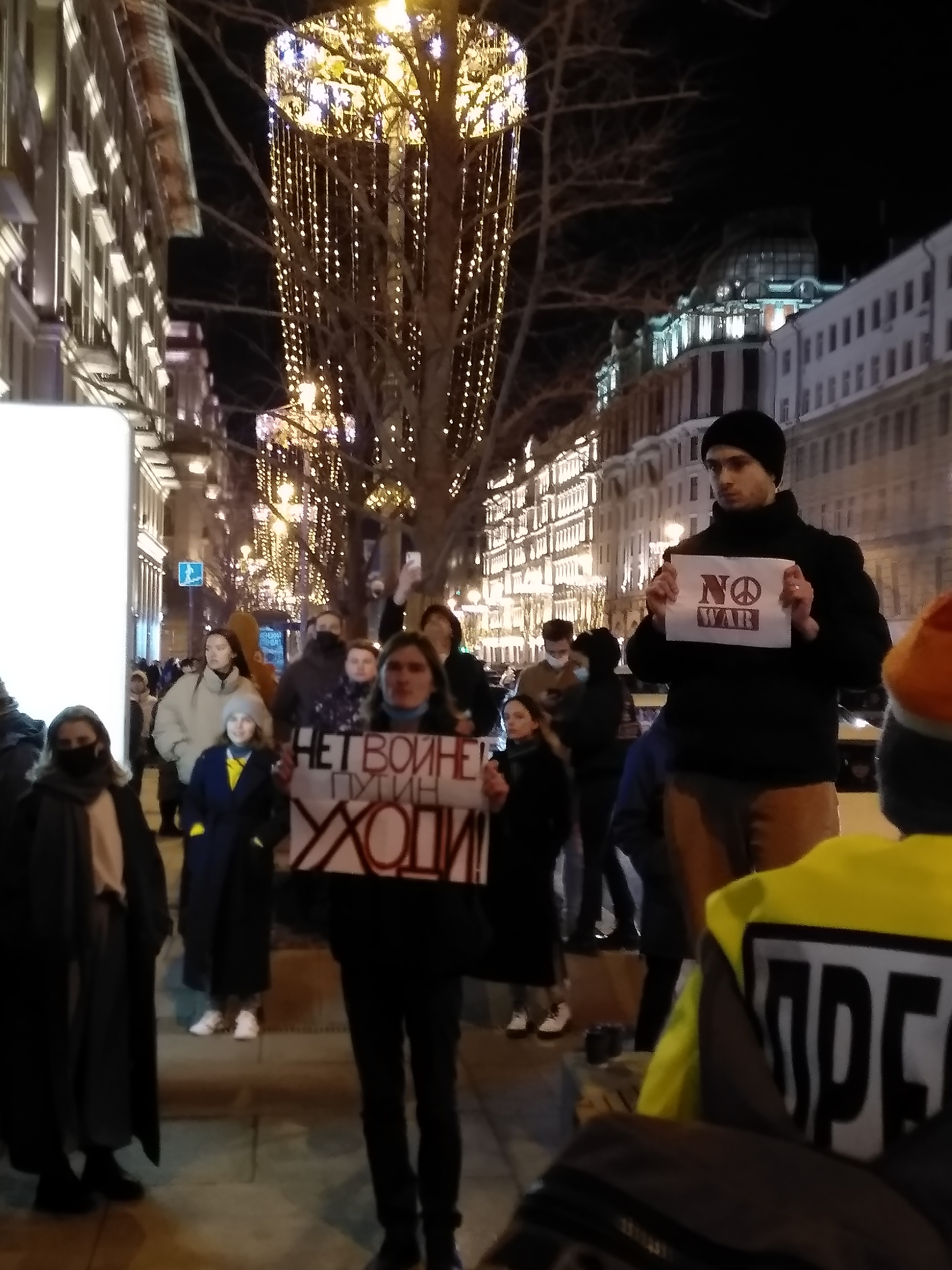
Protest against the invasion of Ukraine (Moscow, 24 February 2022)

Women have played a significant role in the 2022 anti-war protests in Russia. Meduza journalist Alexey Kovalyov has stated that "it's mostly women who are facing real violence and serious prison time." Maria Silina of the Université du Québec à Montréal has stated that "the overwhelming majority of [anti-war protestors] were women, queer or trans — many of whom were rarely visible as political activists in Russia." Women and gender minorities protesting against the war have been targeted with significant brutality by Russian police, including threats of sexual violence.

The Feminist Anti-War Resistance was launched in Russia following the invasion, saying in their manifesto that "feminism as a political force cannot be on the side of a war of aggression and military occupation," that "war exacerbates gender inequality and sets back gains for human rights by many years. War brings with it not only the violence of bombs and bullets but also sexual violence," and that the invasion was being " fought under the banner of the "traditional values" declared by government ideologues [which] include gender inequality, exploitation of women, and state repression against those whose way of life, self-identification, and actions do not conform with narrow patriarchal norms." The group led the protests on International Women's Day on March 8, protesting at monuments to the Great Patriotic War in cities across Russia. The Union of the Committees of Soldiers' Mothers of Russia has also spoken out against the war.

=== Impact on rights ===
In November 2022, Meduza reported the story of the only openly trans woman in the Russian military, who had joined prior to the invasion and was attempting to avoid being sent to the front due to her opposition to the war and the fact that she was dating a Ukrainian man. In December 2022, the Russian government announced further restrictions on LGBT+ rights in the country by expanding the scope of the Russian gay propaganda law.

In Russia, the invasion has also seen an increase in proposals to limit reproductive rights, particularly due to concerns over the loss of population through deceased soldiers and emigration. In August 2022, several members of the State Duma announced that they planned to introduce a bill ending public health insurance coverage of abortion. In September 2022, a bill was introduced in the State Duma that would ban the dissemination of information on voluntary childlessness. In November 2023, all private healthcare clinics in occupied Crimea announced that they would stop providing abortions.

As well, the invasion has caused concerns surrounding domestic violence in Russian society, particularly as the Russian government has recruited prisoners to fight in Ukraine, subsequently pardoning those prisoners, including those who had been imprisoned for violence against women.

== Journalists ==
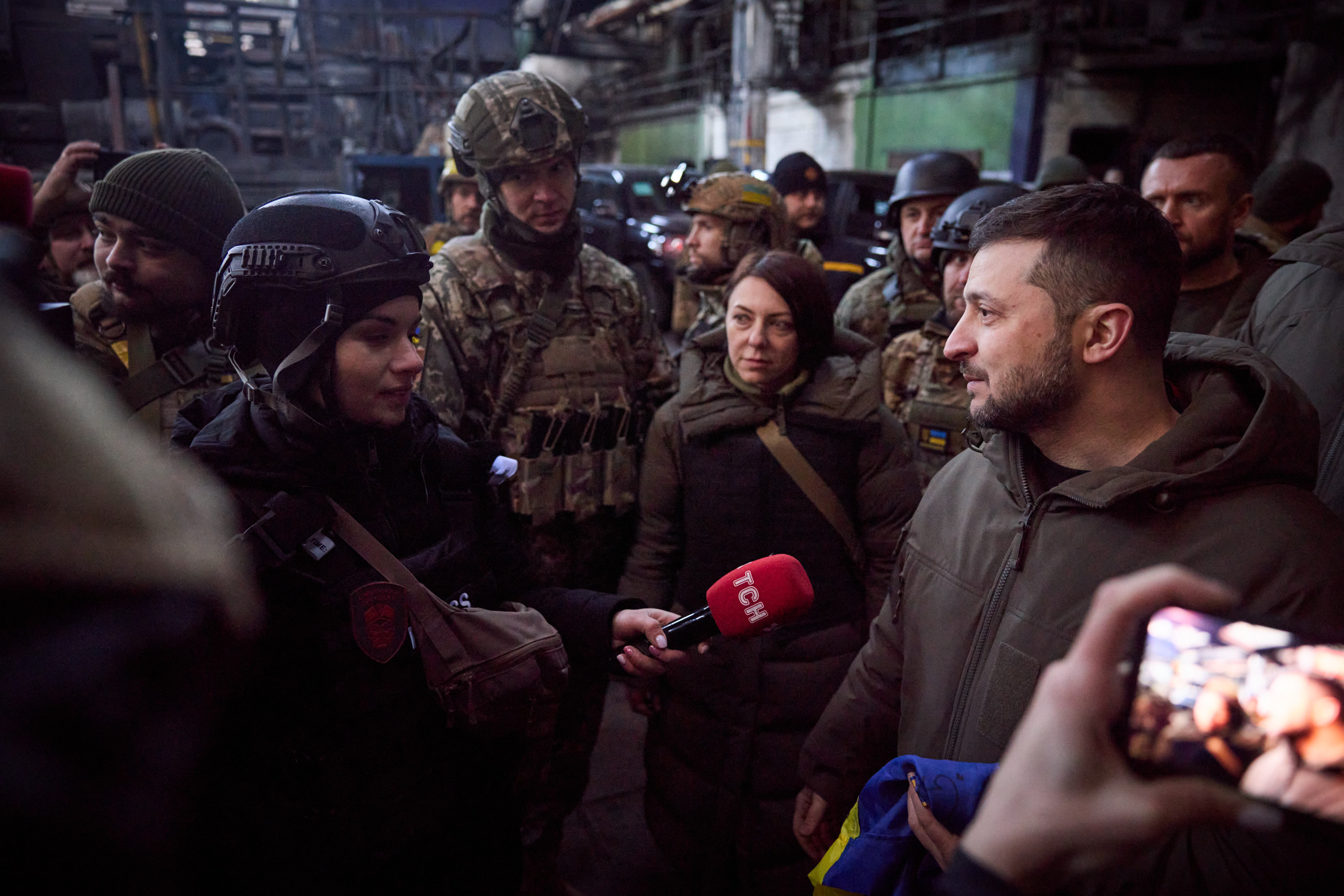
Volodymyr Zelenskyy interviewed while visiting Bakhmut

Women have played a significant role as journalists in the invasion. Lynn Elber of the Associated Press has stated that the "presence of women reporting in Ukraine is set against a backdrop of traditional roles and expectations" but that presence has "changed the nature of war reporting. They cover the tactics of war, but give equal measure to its toll." Women journalists have faced particular difficulties during the invasion. Foreign Policy said that women have made up around 23% of "total experts, protagonists, or sources" in news articles about the invasion. Additional coverage and discussion about the war has been seen by female Ukrainian journalists living abroad, where they work to combat Russian propaganda and work help bring aid and awareness to the situation.

As of 23 March, two of the five journalists confirmed to have been killed in the invasion were women: Oleksandra Kuvshynova and Oksana Baulina. Foreign Policy further quoted Ukrainian Radio journalist Iryna Slavinska as saying upon Kuvshynova's death, "Unfortunately, this happens a lot to Ukrainian women journalists in war," who she said are forced to choose between staying in the conflict area to report or fleeing with their families, in addition to facing the threat of sexual violence.

== In popular culture ==
The song "Stefania" by Kalush Orchestra, the winner of the Eurovision Song Contest 2022, featured women in Ukrainian military uniforms in its music video, with frontman Oleh Psiuk saying that the song had acquired new meanings after the Russian invasion "because a lot of people are perceiving it as if Ukraine is my mother."

== See also ==
- LGBTQ people in the Russo-Ukrainian war
