= Sarah Ashton-Cirillo =

American journalist, activist and soldier (born 1977)

- Сара Ештон-Сірілло
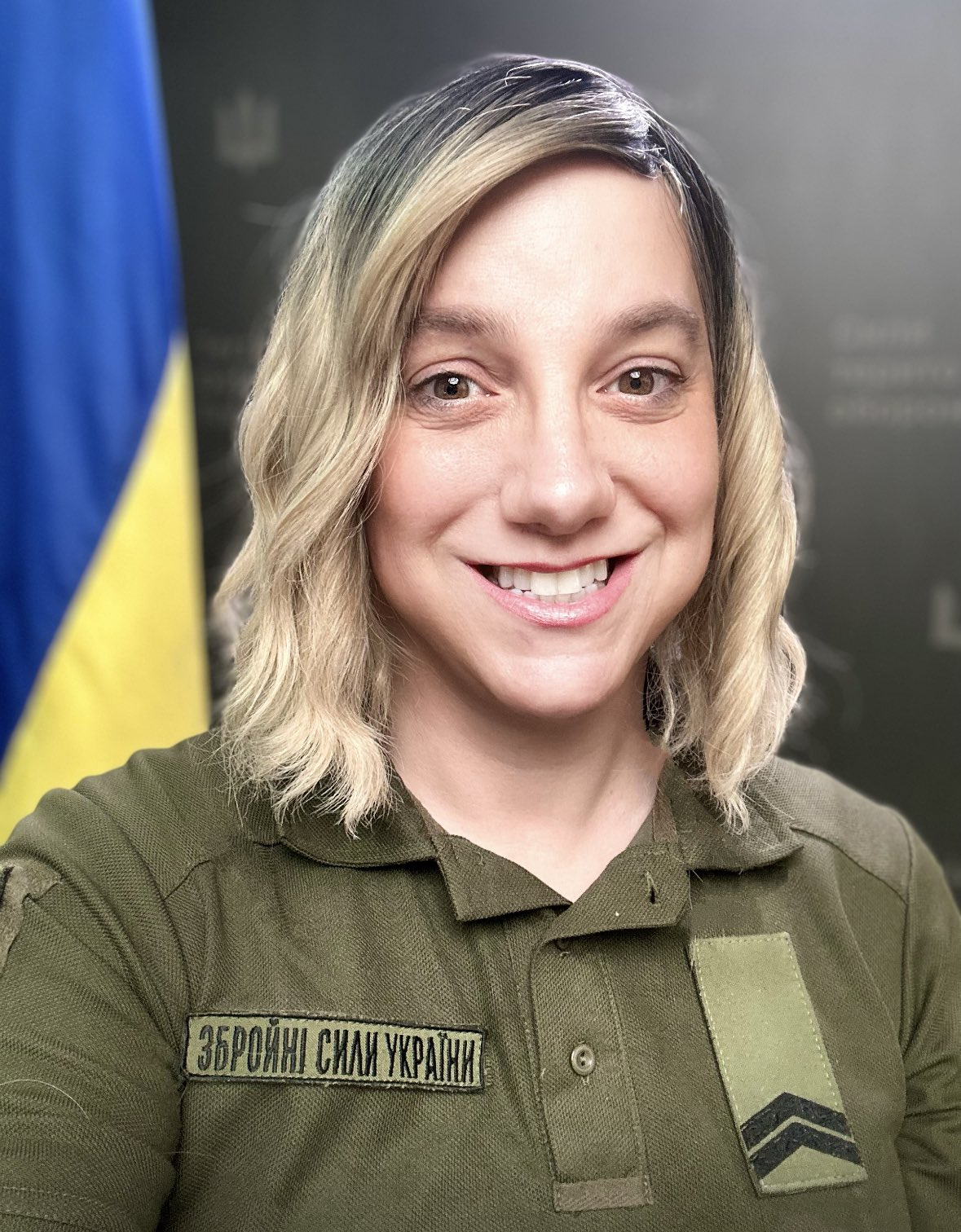
- Ashton-Cirillo in 2023
- Born: 9 July 1977 (age 49); North Florida, United States
- Other names: Sarah Ashton; Sarah Cirillo; Blonde
- Occupations: Journalist; activist; spokesperson; political operative and candidate; combat medic
- Years active: 2020–present
- Employers: Republican candidates in Nevada (2020); Political.tips (2020–present); LGBTQ Nation (Mar–Oct 2022); Media Center Ukraine (Note: Ashton-Cirillo began to work at the Kharkiv Media Hub in the aftermath of Maria Zakharova's comments of 21 April 2022, but coverage in the Washington Blade does not clarify the exact date, nor when she stopped working there.); Zolochiv, Kharkiv Oblast (Note: Ashton-Cirillo became Zolochiv's representative in aid negotiations at some point before 20 July 2022. Her contract was renewed for a year in August. She retained her position after becoming a civilian employee of the Ukrainian Ministry of Defense that same month; coverage in the Washington Blade and USA Today does not clarify whether she remained Zolochiv's representative after joining the Armed Forces of Ukraine in October.); Ukrainian Ministry of Defense (Aug–Oct 2022 as civilian)
- Political party: Democratic (U.S.)
- Children: 1
- Military career
- Allegiance: Ukraine
- Branch: Armed Forces of Ukraine
- Service years: October 2022–February 2025
- Rank: Junior sergeant
- Units: Territorial Defense Forces (headquarters); Noman Çelebicihan Battalion; 209th Battalion (113th Kharkiv Defense Brigade)

Sarah Ashton-Cirillo (Note: Pronounced /səˈrɪloʊ/ sə-RIL-oh. She was formerly known as Sarah Ashton and Sarah Cirillo. Her name is cyrillized as Сара Ештон-Сірілло, pronounced [ˈsɑrɐ ˌɛʃton⁽ʲ⁾s⁽ʲ⁾iˈr⁽ʲ⁾il(ː)o], in Ukrainian media sources, although her press pass uses the surname Ештон-Кірілло.) (born 9 July 1977) is an American former journalist who has worked as a spokesperson for Ukraine's Territorial Defense Forces, in which she is a junior sergeant. A self-described "recovering political operative" from Las Vegas, Nevada, she was active in Nevada politics from 2020 to 2021, including an abortive run for Las Vegas City Council. She arrived in Ukraine in March 2022, shortly after the full-scale Russian invasion, and has variously served as a war correspondent, a representative in aid negotiations, a civilian analyst with the Ministry of Defense, and a combat medic.

Ashton-Cirillo drew national media attention in 2021 when she released records of conversations from her time working with Republican candidates, documenting efforts to recruit members of the Proud Boys, a far-right group, for a planned "Brooks Brothers Riot" (alluding to the 2000 demonstration) as part of efforts to overturn the outcome of the 2020 United States presidential election. In 2022, she leaked a text exchange with the Republican nominee for Nevada Attorney General, which became a key controversy in that election.

Starting in March 2022, Ashton-Cirillo reported on the Russian invasion of Ukraine from Kharkiv, Ukraine, primarily for LGBTQ Nation, often writing about the war's effect on LGBTQ people. A trans woman, she is thought to have been the first openly transgender war correspondent and the only transgender journalist covering the invasion. In Kharkiv, she worked closely with the Ukrainian military and police, and was appointed by the mayor of Zolochiv, Kharkiv Oblast, as a representative to advocate with aid groups. After witnessing and reporting on the October 2022 Kyiv missile strikes—including posting a controversial widely shared video that showed a dead body—she resigned from LGBTQ Nation to become a combat medic in Ukraine's Noman Çelebicihan Battalion, a Crimean Tatar unit. In February 2023, she was wounded by Russian shelling while serving on the front lines in the Donbas with the 209th Battalion of the 113th Kharkiv Defense Brigade. She was subsequently assigned to the Territorial Defense Forces, and became one of its English-language spokespeople in early August 2023; she was suspended in late September pending investigation of unspecified unapproved statements. Ashton-Cirillo was discharged in February 2025.

== Early life, Syrian refugee crisis, and gender transition (1977–2019) ==
Ashton-Cirillo was born on 9 July 1977 in North Florida; she previously had the surname Cirillo. According to her byline with The Nevada Independent, she has lived in Las Vegas since 2004; according to the Nevada Current she "established residency [there] in 2016 to be closer to" her ex-wife and child. In this phase of her life, she worked as a real estate analyst, a poker player, and the communications director at a healthcare company.

In 2015, before her gender transition, Ashton-Cirillo went to Syrian refugee camps in Turkey to report on the refugee crisis, having been afraid to enter Syria itself. She wrote a book about the experience, Along the Tracks of Tears, but was unhappy with its quality, having been preoccupied with concerns about whether the people she traveled with would have accepted her if they knew she was a trans woman.

Ashton-Cirillo started taking feminizing hormones "on and off" in 2018, before deciding to transition in May 2019 after what she described as a "35-year wait to embrace myself". She later said that she would have died if she had not transitioned. Her transition has included gender-affirming surgery and hair regrowth. She was writing Fair. Right. Just. as she was coming to terms with her gender identity, and rushed to finish it for fear that she would kill herself. After beginning her transition, she removed both the novel and Along the Tracks of Tears from circulation, explaining:

I realized in hindsight that I hated myself and wasn't true to myself as a writer. A lot of what was going through my mind, especially in the refugee book, was, "What would these people say if I was trans? What would they do?" I felt like a liar because I wasn't living authentically.

== Nevada politics ==
Ashton-Cirillo described herself as a progressive activist and leftist libertarian when she was active in Nevada politics, and has since referred to herself as a "recovering political operative"; she has been described in The Washington Post and The Nevada Independent as a liberal activist and in the Las Vegas Review-Journal as "unapologetically left-leaning". She was a registered member of the Democratic Party as of February 2022.

=== Nevada Republican Party and Proud Boys (2020–2021) ===
In September 2020, Ashton-Cirillo began working as an opposition research operative with Republican candidates in Nevada under the name Sarah Cirillo. She later told the Post and Nevada Current that her initial purpose in switching parties was to conduct research for her book on extremism and help her friend, Nadia Krall, get elected to a local judgeship as a Republican. According to The Daily Beast, Ashton-Cirillo convinced Krall to change her party affiliation from Democratic to Republican in order to pick up endorsements from Ashton-Cirillo's high-profile Republican contacts. Taking on a hard-right, Trumpist persona, Ashton-Cirillo developed ties with Nevada Republicans by attending and hosting rallies organized by prominent party figures. She commented to the Post that her record as a liberal activist was available on the internet, and told the Beast that "these guys were too stupid to look into my progressive politics, because they were so eager to tokenize me". She was open about her transgender status. Some were indifferent to it, while Republican attorney Sigal Chattah saw it as a positive and referred to Ashton-Cirillo as a "unicorn".

Following the 2020 presidential election, Ashton-Cirillo became involved with efforts to bring members of the Proud Boys—a far-right, men-only group that would later play a role in the attack on the U.S. Capitol—to a rally in front of the Clark County election department, part of nationwide efforts to overturn Joe Biden's victory. The day after the election, Ashton-Cirillo received a message from the vice president of McShane LLC, a firm hired by the Republican Party to investigate electoral fraud. In the message, given to the Post in 2021, the McShane vice president said that Republican Congressman Paul Gosar was planning a "Brooks Brothers Riot" in Arizona—referencing the 2000 demonstration by Republican staffers that contributed to George W. Bush's victory—and that Ashton-Cirillo should start planning something similar in Nevada; the McShane vice president said that they should "get the Proud Boys out". This led Ashton-Cirillo to contact a group of far-right activists, at least one of whom was a member of the Proud Boys. The proportion of those wearing Proud Boy colors in the crowd was relatively small, and the protest remained peaceful. Gosar denies having discussed any protests with the McShane vice president.

The Clark County Republican Party subsequently banned seven people from participating in Republican county affairs, citing racist and anti-Semitic texts disclosed to them by Ashton-Cirillo. One of those banned was a Proud Boy who Ashton-Cirillo had contacted when recruiting for the Clark County rally.

=== Blundo defense and Las Vegas City Council run (2021) ===
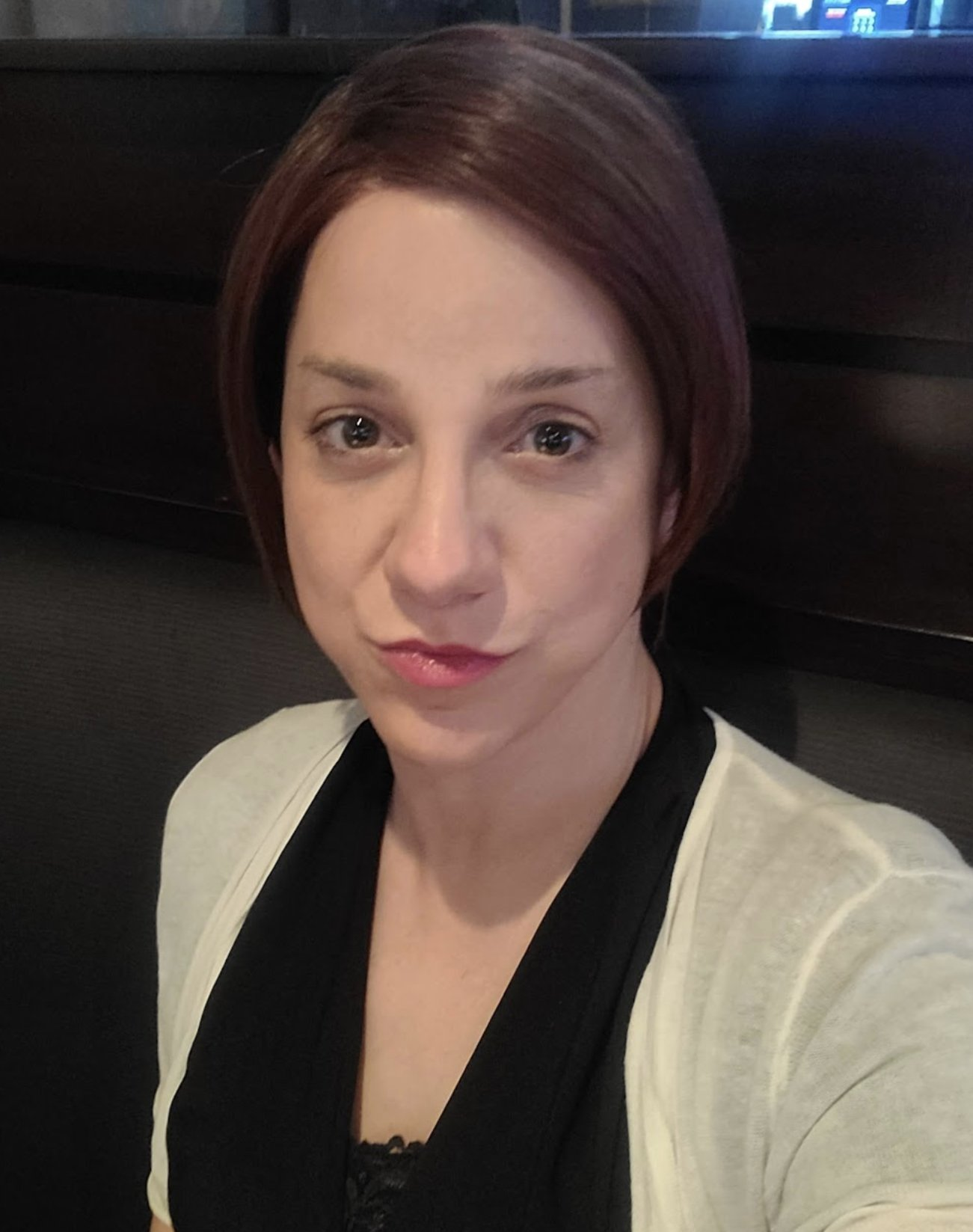
Ashton-Cirillo in October 2021

In early 2021, Ashton-Cirillo worked to coordinate the defense of Leo Blundo, a Republican Nye County official accused of unlawfully voting to give his own business CARES Act funds. Blundo denounced the accusations as "deep state, swamp behavior" and Ashton-Cirillo hailed him at a press conference as "an innocent man", to applause from the crowd. The Nevada attorney general's office declined to bring charges against Blundo.

By the spring of 2021, Ashton-Cirillo decided to run for Las Vegas City Council as a Democrat under the name Sarah Ashton (having changed her name to Sarah Ashton-Cirillo that March). She initially intended to run in the second ward against the Republican incumbent, Victoria Seaman. In June, she switched her candidacy to the sixth ward, challenging Michele Fiore, also a Republican. Ashton-Cirillo told the Current that she had provided the Federal Bureau of Investigation (FBI) with "copious amounts" of correspondence between her and Fiore, as part of an ongoing FBI probe into Fiore's campaign finance spending.

Ashton-Cirillo withdrew from the race in October, saying she wished to focus on a political news portal she had created, Political.tips.

=== Political.tips and Chattah texts controversy (2022) ===
Chattah: "Do you know that Aaron ford opposed ESA and converting schools in low income areas to charter schools"
Ashton-Cirillo: "Yes imaginary issues for an imaginary administration"
Chattah: "This guy should be hanging from a fucking crane"
Ashton-Cirillo: "And fictional media"
Chattah:

"He doesn't give a fuck about advancing opportunities in underserved communities.
He's a bigger piece of shit than I imagined
It's so shameful
He's like the leader of Hamas—making tons of money while the People in Gaza are starving"

— Ashton-Cirillo, "As Nevada LEO Hack Exposes 'Pretty' Eric Garner Killing; Chattah Text Calls for Ford Hanging. More"

Through Political.tips, Ashton-Cirillo reported on Nevada-related aspects of BlueLeaks, a set of law enforcement data released by Distributed Denial of Secrets in June 2020. In an article related to BlueLeaks, Ashton-Cirillo leaked texts with her former friend, Sigal Chattah, then a Republican candidate for Nevada Attorney General. In the leaked exchange, Chattah compared incumbent Aaron D. Ford to the leader of Hamas and said he "should be hanging from a fucking crane". Ford is Black, and some saw the remark as racist; Ford refused to debate Chattah, saying "she doesn't respect my dignity as a human". Ashton-Cirillo said that she does not think Chattah is racist nor intended to allude to Ford's race, and that her goal in releasing the texts had been to criticize Chattah's temperament. Ford ultimately won re-election; HuffPost highlighted the leaked texts as a major controversy in the race.

== Invasion of Ukraine ==
Ashton-Cirillo said that she began to "hate Russia" after visiting museums in the Baltic States while she was writing a novel, Fair. Right. Just., which she self-published in 2017. When Russia invaded Ukraine in full in February 2022, she traveled to Ukraine with plans to write a book on both the resulting refugee crisis and her previous experience with the Syrian refugee crisis.

=== Journalism and activism (March–August 2022) ===
Ashton-Cirillo arrived in Ukraine through Poland on 4 March 2022. Having transitioned since her time in Syria, she was initially hesitant to enter the country based on things she had heard about LGBT rights in Ukraine. Ukrainian border authorities made her remove her wig when they reviewed her travel documents. While her Nevada driver's license reflects her changed name and gender identity as a woman, her U.S. passport does not, and as a result, she was issued a press credential that refers to her primarily by her current name but notes her former name as well. Ashton-Cirillo said she understood both decisions; regarding the latter, she told the Washington Blade, "I was okay with it because I couldn't believe they credentialed me anyway with the situation being the way it was." After entering the country she went to Lviv, and from there, wanting to be closer to the front lines, to Ivano-Frankivsk. There, two men invited her to come to Kharkiv, saying other journalists were fleeing the city because it was too dangerous. At the time she did not have a combat helmet, chest protector, or plates to indicate herself as a member of the press.

Ashton-Cirillo settled in Kharkiv, renting an apartment in North Saltivka—one of the more heavily bombed parts of the city. This differed from the practice of most foreign journalists, who made trips in and out of the region, some staying at Ashton-Cirillo's apartment. Starting shortly after she arrived in Kharkiv, Ashton-Cirillo reported for LGBTQ Nation on the impact of the war on LGBTQ people, initially as a freelancer. Her work included interviews with gay men fighting in Ukraine, reporting on the challenges faced by LGBTQ Ukrainians trying to leave the country after men of fighting age were prohibited from leaving, and documentation of Russian war crimes against LGBTQ people. She also reported on the war on Twitter and in a serialized book titled Trans at the Front, published over Substack. She appeared on the BBC's Ukrainecast in June to discuss the Russian army's use of castration to terrorize Ukraine's population.

Sarah Ashton-Cirillo
(@SarahAshtonLV)
tweeted:

Incredible news from Kharkiv!

Reports are that Chilean Russian spy @realGonzaloLira has been captured in #Kharkiv (Kharkov).

He is (allegedly) a Russian saboteur posing as a "journalist", to destroy #Ukraine️.

Congrats to Ukrainian security services.

#StandWithUkraine️

April 18, 2022

In this same time period, Ashton-Cirillo developed close ties with the Ukrainian army and police, sometimes bringing them food and delivering weapons to checkpoints. After she reported the detention of pro-Russian commentator Gonzalo Lira by Ukrainian security forces, the Russian Ministry of Foreign Affairs (MFA) falsely accused her of being allied with Nazis and celebrating Lira's supposed murder; Lira was released unharmed the next day. MFA spokeswoman Maria Zakharova highlighted that Ashton-Cirillo is transgender and referenced "liberal queers and 'honest' Western journalists". In the aftermath of this, Ashton-Cirillo began working at Kharkiv Media Hub, part of Media Center Ukraine, and helped José Andrés's World Central Kitchen operate in areas retaken from Russia. After she visited the Russian-speaking Ukrainian settlement of Zolochiv, Kharkiv Oblast (15 miles (24 km) from the Russian border), to report on relief efforts, the settlement's mayor made her its official representative so that she could advocate on its behalf with aid groups.

Ashton-Cirillo experienced significant harassment on Twitter from supporters of Russia as a result of Zakharova's post, including threats of kidnapping, torture, and death. She sued an American conservative commentator for defamation after he repeated conspiracy theories that she had had Lira murdered; her lawyer was later ordered to rewrite the suit because it contained "politically-charged declarations and personal attacks". InfoWars, misgendering Ashton-Cirillo, accused her of "palling around with the neo-Nazi Azov battalion members", in what Adam Zivo—who had previously profiled Ashton-Cirillo for Xtra Magazine—described in an opinion piece in the Washington Examiner as "a hit piece ... that parroted Russia's discredited claims".

=== Transition toward military role (August–October 2022) ===
Ashton-Cirillo began to reassess her place in the conflict during the summer of 2022 after witnessing a Russian artillery strike on a building across the street from her in Zolochiv. In his Examiner opinion piece, Zivo said that Ashton-Cirillo had first sought to enlist in the Armed Forces of Ukraine (AFU or UAF) in July, but had delayed her plans in order to support other foreign journalists during the September Ukrainian counteroffensive. She became a civilian employee of the Ministry of Defence of Ukraine in August, in addition to her role representing Zolochiv. That same month, she stopped reporting for LGBTQ Nation due to her conflict of interest with the AFU. Her work for the Ukrainian government included writing policy papers and analyses.

Ashton-Cirillo was the first journalist on the scene of the Russian strike on Kyiv on 10 October 2022, which occurred 700 feet (210 m) from where she was staying. Her footage of the aftermath, which showed a dead body in the street, was widely shared on social media subsequently, stoking controversy. She later told Tatiana Vorozhko of Voice of America that she did not expect the controversy, as dead bodies had become routine in East Ukraine.

=== Front-line soldier and emissary to D.C. (October 2022 – May 2023) ===
Ashton-Cirillo was already prepared to enlist in the AFU by the time of the missile strike on Kyiv, and sought enlistment at a recruitment station shortly thereafter; on 12 October 2022 she announced by tweet that she had entered the AFU as a senior combat medic. She then resigned as a correspondent at LGBTQ Nation. She said that, "as a country girl from the [American] South" she "know[s] how to shoot", and that she had previous training in medicine. Her colonel determined that her transgender status was not an issue, and she passed the standard physical exam. She completed her combat medic training on 27 October. She was initially assigned to the Noman Çelebicihan Battalion, where she was given the call sign Blonde. According to Ashton-Cirillo and journalist Ayder Muzhdabaev (the latter writing in a blog post with Ukrainska Pravda), the Crimean Tatar unit is led by Lenur Islyamov.

Ashton-Cirillo does not speak Ukrainian, but communicates with fellow soldiers in English, Spanish, or German, or through Google Translate. In an interview with Croatian TV channel N1 two and a half weeks into her enlistment, she proclaimed, as she had before, that "Ukraine has already won" and called for a return to the 1991 borders. She said that she had been issued an AK-74 in addition to her equipment as a medic and that she would use it to suppress enemy fire. She told the Blade that she had won praise in her unit after Russian state media featured footage of her firing a machine gun and vowing to retake Crimea.

In mid–December 2022 Ashton-Cirillo met with members of the United States Congress, including Senator Roger Wicker (R-Miss.), as well as lawmakers' aides, activists, non-governmental organization employees, and members of the Commission on Security and Cooperation in Europe. Invoking her background as an analyst, she argued on behalf of Ukraine that continued military aid to the country would have a high return on investment. She further invited members of the government to come to Ukraine and see the weapons in action.

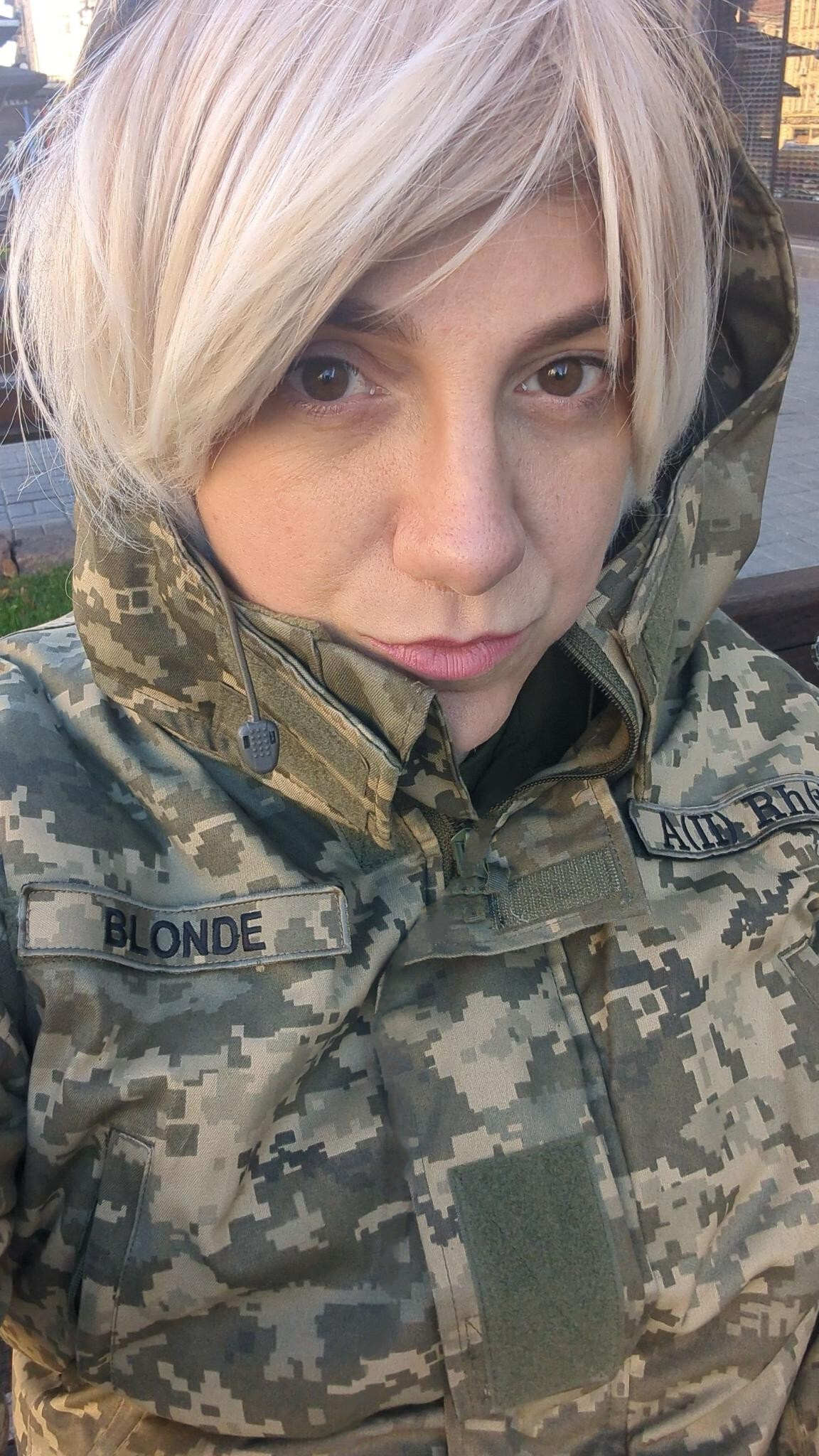
The name patch on Ashton-Cirillo's uniform (photographed November 2022) reads "Blonde".

In February 2023, Ashton-Cirillo, then with the 209th Battalion of the 113th Kharkiv Defense Brigade, advanced toward the front in the Donbas. On 22 February, she was wounded in action by Russian shelling and could not be evacuated for seven hours. She lost some mobility in her right hand and was left with two small scars on her face. According to Ashton-Cirillo, her unit inflicted "tremendous casualties" in the battle in which she was wounded. In a video taken while another soldier bandaged her hand, she said, "They can't kill us. They can't hurt us. Victory is ours. It doesn't fucking matter. Why? Because we're Ukraine". In a subsequent tweet, she said she had been hospitalized. After Ashton-Cirillo was wounded, Russian forces placed a bounty on her, as they have with other high-profile soldiers, causing the Ukrainian Army to cease using her recognizable nickname Blonde over the radio.

A recovered Ashton-Cirillo returned to Washington, D.C., in May, having been promoted to junior sergeant in early April. She met with three members of the House of Representatives and aides for several others, as well as José Andrés, whose World Central Kitchen she worked with in Kharkiv.

=== TDF spokesperson and suspension (June 2023 – February 2025) ===
In June, Ashton-Cirillo was assigned to work on English-language media for the Army's Territorial Defense Forces (TDF), and in August she was appointed as one of the TDF's English-language spokespeople. Ukraine's Deputy Defense Minister, Hanna Maliar, cited Ashton-Cirillo's reach on Twitter of 28.3 million users over a one-month span and praised her work "debunk[ing] Russian fakes and propaganda".

Ashton-Cirillo's YouTube shows "Ukraine in the Know" and "Russia Hates the Truth", produced from a studio in Kyiv, led to an hour-long special on Russian television calling her a "terrible disgrace to the Ukrainian people". She subsequently said she "embrace[s] the hate of the Russians". In August she called for a boycott of CNN for a story that called foreign fighters for Ukraine "mercenaries"; CNN corrected the term.

In September 2023, Ashton-Cirillo posted a video in which she said that "Russia's war criminal propagandists will all be hunted down, and justice will be served". The statement sparked criticism by supporters of Russia. On 18 September, U.S. Senator JD Vance, who has opposed U.S. support of Ukraine, wrote a letter to several Biden administration officials accusing Ashton-Cirillo of threatening violence against "anyone who circulates 'Russian propaganda'" and querying her background and connections to the United States. Ashton-Cirillo characterized the letter as "disappointing" and the result of "Russian lies", and told Newsweek that there would be due process for alleged Russian propagandists and war criminals.

The TDF suspended Ashton-Cirillo on 20 September pending investigation of unapproved statements. They did not specify the statements in question, but The Daily Beast and Kyiv Post speculated that the Vance controversy was the cause, while The Advocate asserted this conclusively.

In February 2024, Rosfinmonitoring added Ashton-Cirillo on its list of "extremists and terrorists". In November 2024, the Basmanny District Court began proceedings against Ashton-Cirillo in absentia on charges of producing alleged fake news against the military and mercenarism. In June 2025, the Russian-backed Supreme Court of the Donetsk People's Republic found her guilty on both charges and sentenced her to 20 years imprisonment.

Ashton-Cirillo's service concluded in February 2025.

== Impact ==
During her time as a war correspondent, Ashton-Cirillo was thought to have been the only transgender journalist covering the Russian invasion of Ukraine; a 2023 profile by Cady Stanton in USA Today described her as "the world's first openly transgender war correspondent". According to Ashton-Cirillo, many local Ukrainians do not realize that she is transgender. She said that the other soldiers in her unit did know, and that "some people are completely great with it"; some have asked questions that she says come from places of "genuine curiosity". She favorably contrasted her experience as a trans person in Ukraine to her experience in the United States:

In the United States, people want to objectify trans folks, and the entire LGBTQ+ community, as a wedge issue. And in Ukraine? If Sarah is willing to fucking go to Russia, we don't care that she's trans because there's nobody else here. She's come on missions with us where we've been shelled. Or she kept on filming as a rocket hit behind her. That's what matters to them.

She has likewise favorably contrasted her experience as a journalist in both countries, telling Vorozhko, "I had more freedom as a reporter in Ukraine, under martial law, than I would trying to even film the police in the United States".

Ashton-Cirillo's mixture of journalism and activism, a controversial practice among journalists, have made her popular among Ukrainians. El País described her as "one of the most significant voices for Ukrainian propaganda" and "the most famous soldier in the Ukrainian military". Malcolm Nance, an American media pundit who joined the International Legion of Territorial Defence of Ukraine, praised Ashton-Cirillo's commitment and said, "Artillery shells don't give two fucks about your gender identity. A bullet does not care what pronouns you use. Cold starving people don't care. They just know good humanity when they see it, and that's what I feel she embodies." According to Nance, villagers call Ashton-Cirillo Saravchka, 'our little Sarah'. Zivo characterized Ashton-Cirillo's popularity among Ukrainians and "the near-total absence of transphobia she has experienced" as emblematic of a larger shift in Ukrainian attitudes toward LGBT people. Ashton-Cirillo said that the media is "sensationalizing the fact that there is a trans soldier here". According to her, there is at least one other trans woman—a Ukrainian—fighting for Ukraine.

Zivo's piece about Ashton-Cirillo in the Examiner, which is often perceived as hostile to trans people, led Evan Urquhart in Slate to remark on the piece's uncharacteristically positive tone. Zivo countered in the National Post that Ashton-Cirillo, as a "conservative-friendly ... patriotic, brave and non-identitarian" trans person, presented an opportunity "to show that human decency can transcend the culture wars", even if "she considers some of [the Examiner's] content to be hateful". Ashton-Cirillo said that her transition does not define her, and "is just an added aspect of who I happen to be". J. K. Rowling, an author known for her controversial views on transgender rights, retweeted Ashton-Cirillo's post about being wounded, which drew the attention of Times Radio and El País. Ashton-Cirillo told the former that she thanked Rowling for her support of Ukraine and deferred commentary on identity politics. She stressed the importance of freedom of speech, telling El País "We're willing to die so that people like Rowling have the right to express themselves freely."
