= LGBTQ people in the Russo-Ukrainian war =

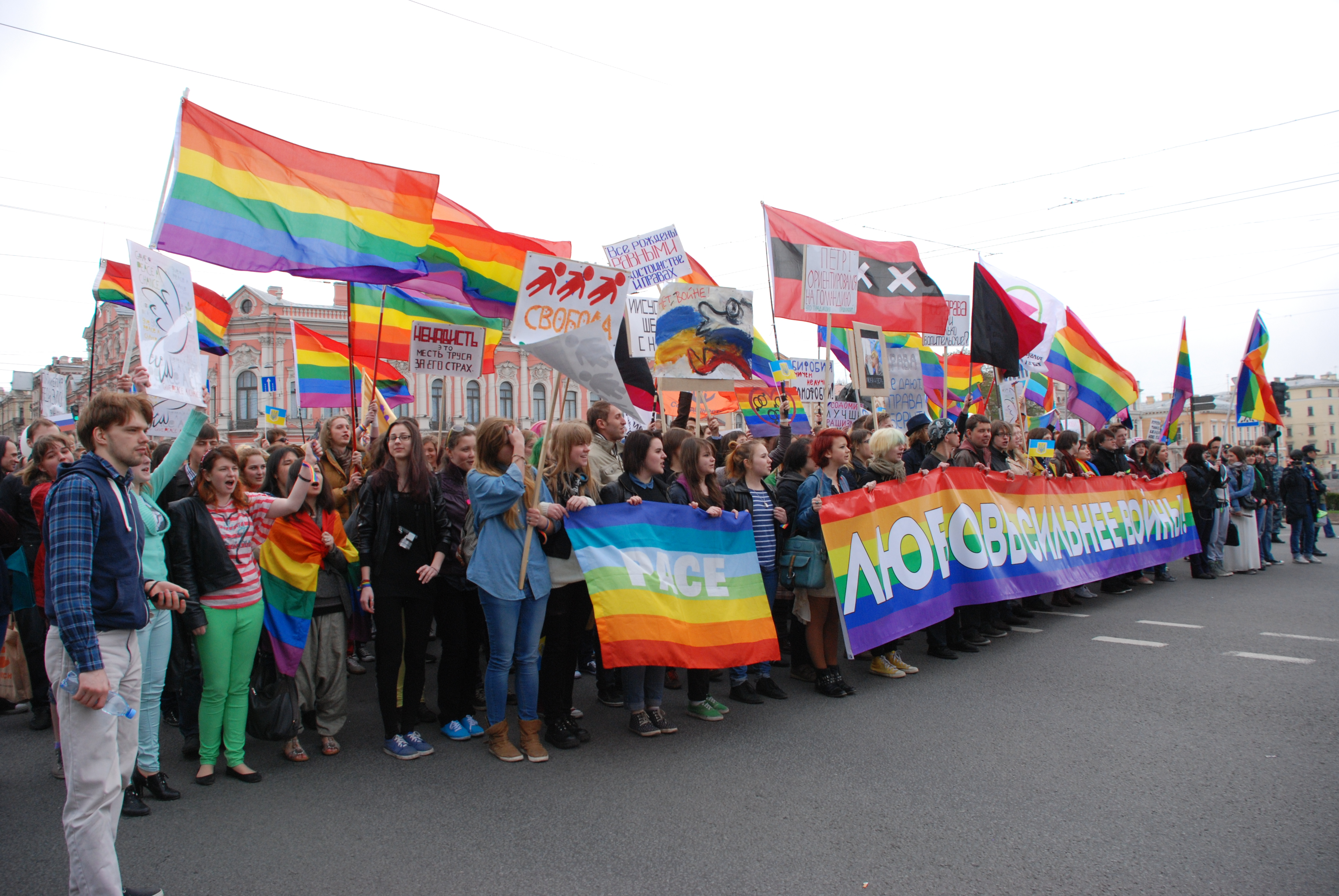
"Love is stronger than war". Rainbow May Day 2014

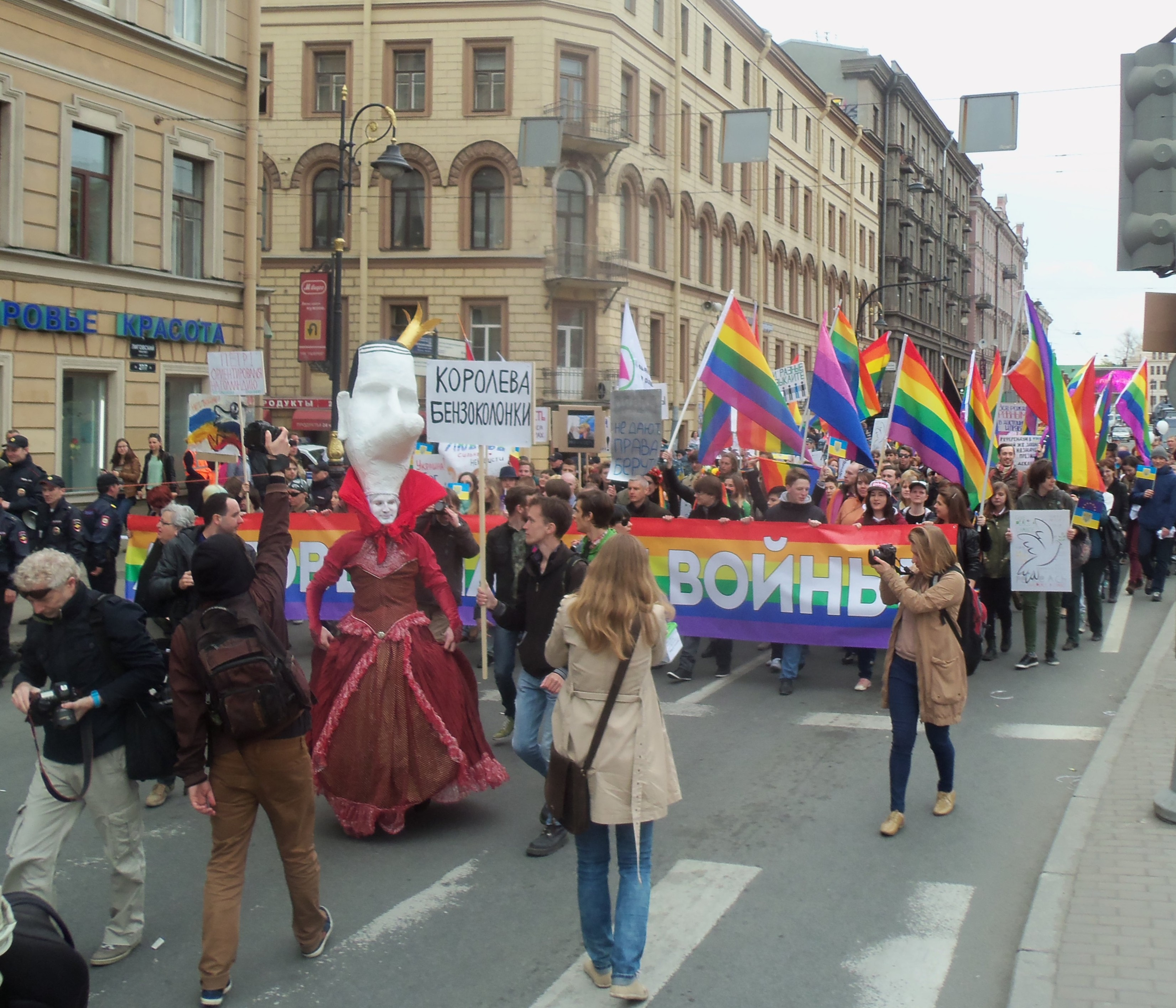
Rainbow May Day 2014

Lesbian, gay, bisexual, and transgender (LGBT) people have played a role in multiple aspects of the Russo-Ukrainian war.

After Russia's annexation of Crimea from Ukraine in 2014 and the subsequent creation of the Donetsk People's Republic and Luhansk People's Republic, two Russian puppet states in eastern Ukraine, thus beginning the Russo-Ukrainian war, the number of homophobic hate attacks—‌including those committed by the government—‌in Russia has sharply increased. Since the start of the full-scale Russian invasion of Ukraine in February 2022, numerous cases of homophobic violence against LGBTQ Ukrainians by the Russian military have been documented. Russian authorities have also tightened domestic legislation discriminating against LGBTQ people during the invasion.

Meanwhile, in Ukraine, ever since the Revolution of Dignity that established a more pro-Western course for the country's politics, acceptance of LGBTQ people gradually increased. Since the start of the full-scale Russian invasion, that trend has intensified. The participation of LGBTQ Ukrainians in the military has served as an impetus for this change. The Kyiv International Institute of Sociology has noted a trend towards positive reception of LGBTQ people in the country over the time.

== Background ==
=== Russia ===
Homophobia in Russia has been pushed by the Russian government as part of the larger narrative about "traditional values" of Russia as juxtaposed with the "immorality" of the Western world, and the subsequent civilizational mission of Russia. Russia is portrayed as a bastion of conservative values, such as tradition, a strict social hierarchy and sexual order, and the prominent role played by religion. Vladimir Putin invoked this rhetoric during the 2011–2013 Russian protests. Russian government policies have since formalized to oppress LGBT people and restrict women's rights in the country.

=== Ukraine ===
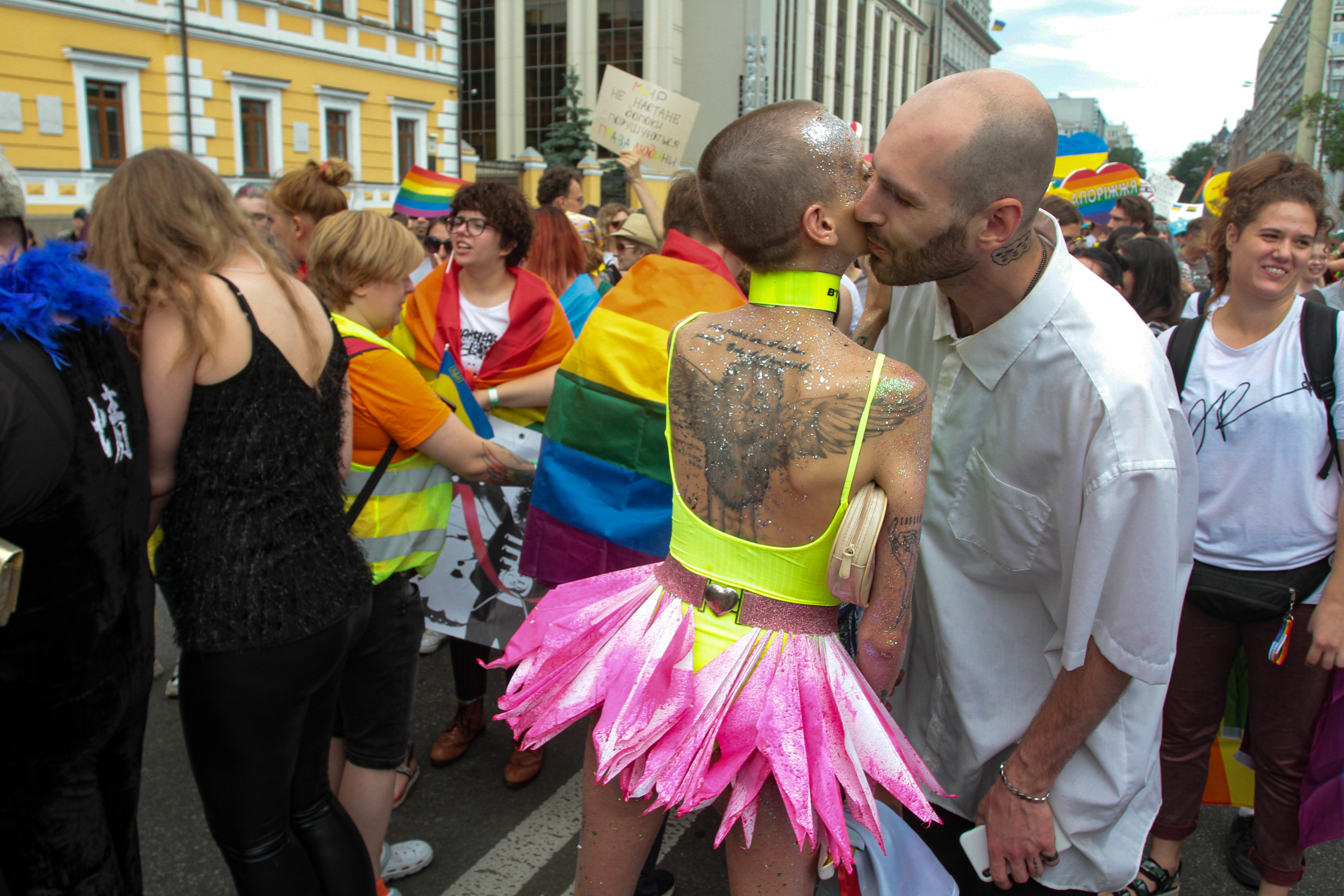
Marchers at the KyivPride event in 2019

The first Ukrainian LGBT organizations emerged in the 1990s, and during the 2000s, local and international organizations, such as George Soros's International Renaissance Foundation, became important in the society of Ukraine's relationship with LGBT. Pride parades began to attain greater popularity and acceptance in the country in the 2010s, and by 2020 pride events were taking place not only in the capital Kyiv, but also in Kharkiv, Zaporizhzhia, Kryvyi Rih, Kherson and Odesa.

Since Euromaidan, Ukraine begun to pay more attention to LGBT rights. In 2015, a ban on workplace discrimination based on gender identity or sexual orientation was added to Ukrainian law. While domestic anti-LGBT movements weakened and lost popularity, Russia remained a source of homophobic sentiment exported into Ukraine. Russian authorities tried to promote ultra-conservative ideas in Ukraine and other countries to fight LGBT movements. Under the pro-Russian president Victor Yanukovych, the Ukrainian parliament introduced bills to ban "gay propaganda" similar to the Russian model three times.

In 2023, the English city of Liverpool hosted KyivPride, after previously hosting the Eurovision Song Contest on behalf of Ukraine.

== During the Russo-Ukrainian War ==
=== LGBT rights in occupied territories of Ukraine from 2014 to 2022 ===
==== Donbas ====
Contrary to perceptions of it being a conservative region, the Donbas in eastern Ukraine has traditionally been the most LGBT-supportive region in the country. This situation changed dramatically after the beginning of the war in Donbas, when pro-Russian militias seized vast areas in Luhansk Oblast and Donetsk Oblast. Homophobia occupied an important place in the rhetoric of the groups. In the occupied territories, systemic persecution and targeted killings of LGBTQ people began. The constitution of the Donetsk People's Republic (DPR) included a ban on same-sex unions. In 2015, both the DPR and the Luhansk People's Republic (LPR) passed discriminatory "gay propaganda" laws along the lines of Russia's. Local LGBTQ organizations were quickly destroyed, and many LGBTQ people were forced to flee the Donbas.

In August 2015, a blogger called the police office of the LPR, saying he wanted to file a report about a so-called "heterosexual brothel" in Luhansk city. The LPR representative replied that heterosexuality was prohibited in the republic and said he had sent a squad to the address - seemingly confusing heterosexuality (attraction to the opposite sex or gender) with homosexuality (attraction to the same sex or gender).

==== Crimea ====
Since the times of the Soviet Union, when sodomy was a criminal offense, the Simeiz resort in Crimea has been a popular destination for LGBTQ tourism. There were LGBT-friendly bars in Sevastopol, and LGBTQ activists and organizations were included in Crimean public society. After Russia's annexation of Crimea, discriminatory Russian laws came into effect in the region. Violence against LGBTQ people became more frequent, including by Russian security forces. The human rights organization Memorial documented cases in which police officers used torture to force LGBT Crimeans, as well as other vulnerable groups, to hand over their property and real estate. Many of the approximately 10,000 LGBTQ people in Crimea were forced to flee the region.

=== During the full-scale invasion of Ukraine ===
==== Russia ====
In Vladimir Putin's address On conducting a special military operation in which he announced the beginning of the full-scale Russian invasion of Ukraine in 2022, his rationale for war included claims that he was protecting traditional values from Western progressive attitudes "that are directly leading to degradation and degeneration, because they are contrary to human nature" - referring to the acceptance and legal recognition of LGBT people in Western countries.

==== Ukraine ====
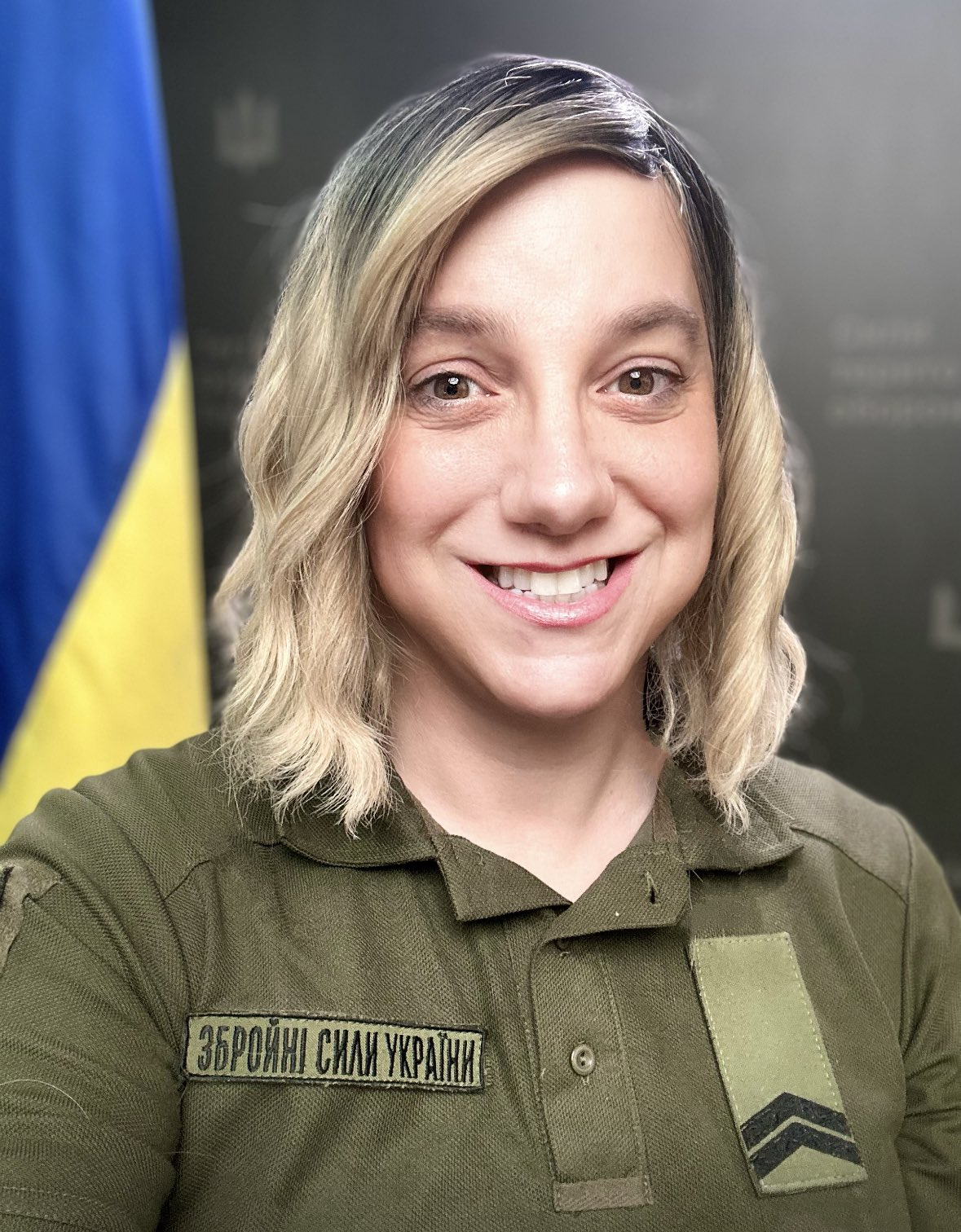
Sarah Ashton-Cirillo, American former journalist who has worked as a spokesperson for Ukraine's Territorial Defense Forces

In Ukrainian society, there has been a "sharp increase in support for the country’s LGBT community". In particular, support for same-sex civil partnerships has grown. One of the biggest reasons for this is the participation of queer Ukrainians in the military during the war. A common argument for expanding LGBT rights in the country has been that they fight against the Russian invaders on an equal basis to any other Ukrainians. In a 2022 study, even among respondents who expressed a negative view of LGBT people in general, 53.8% supported them being allowed into the military. Among respondents who expressed a generally positive view of LGBT people, support was 82.6%. There are other reasons as well. According to TIME Magazine, for some Ukrainians, "homophobia has become almost synonymous with Russian aggression", due to Putin's embrace of homophobia as a defining feature of his anti-Western rhetoric and policy. On the other hand, acceptance of queer people has been positively associated with the West and Europe, which Ukraine has tried to align itself with since the Revolution of Dignity.

However, LGBTQ people have been made vulnerable in Ukraine during the invasion. In the first months of the invasion, transgender people in Ukraine faced shortages of transgender hormone therapy drugs, which international aid organizations helped to overcome. Due to the closure of borders for men 18–60 years old in Ukraine, Ukrainian transgender women who had not completed their legal transition and still retained the "male" gender marker in their documents could not leave the country.

As of 2023, there are no same-sex civil partnerships in Ukraine. As a consequence, "if a queer [Ukrainian] soldier is injured or killed in action, the lack of legal recognition of same-sex partnerships means that their significant other will not be afforded the right to make medical decisions on their behalf, bury them, or collect any state compensation." In response to petitions calling for legislation about same-sex marriage, Ukrainian president Volodymyr Zelenskyy has said that he supports greater equality; he called for the Prime Minister of Ukraine to review civil partnerships for same-sex couples, and said in 2024 that he would sign such a bill if parliament passed it, but has said that same-sex marriage would require an amendment to the Ukrainian constitution, which "cannot be changed during a state of war or emergency."

== See also ==
- Sarah Ashton-Cirillo, an American transgender war correspondent who has fought on the side of Ukraine, and often reports about the war's impact on queer people
- Unicorn Battalion, LGBTQ personnel in the Ukrainian Armed Forces
- Women in the Russian invasion of Ukraine
