= Media Center Ukraine =

Ukrainian NGO to coordinate media during the war

- Медіацентр Україна
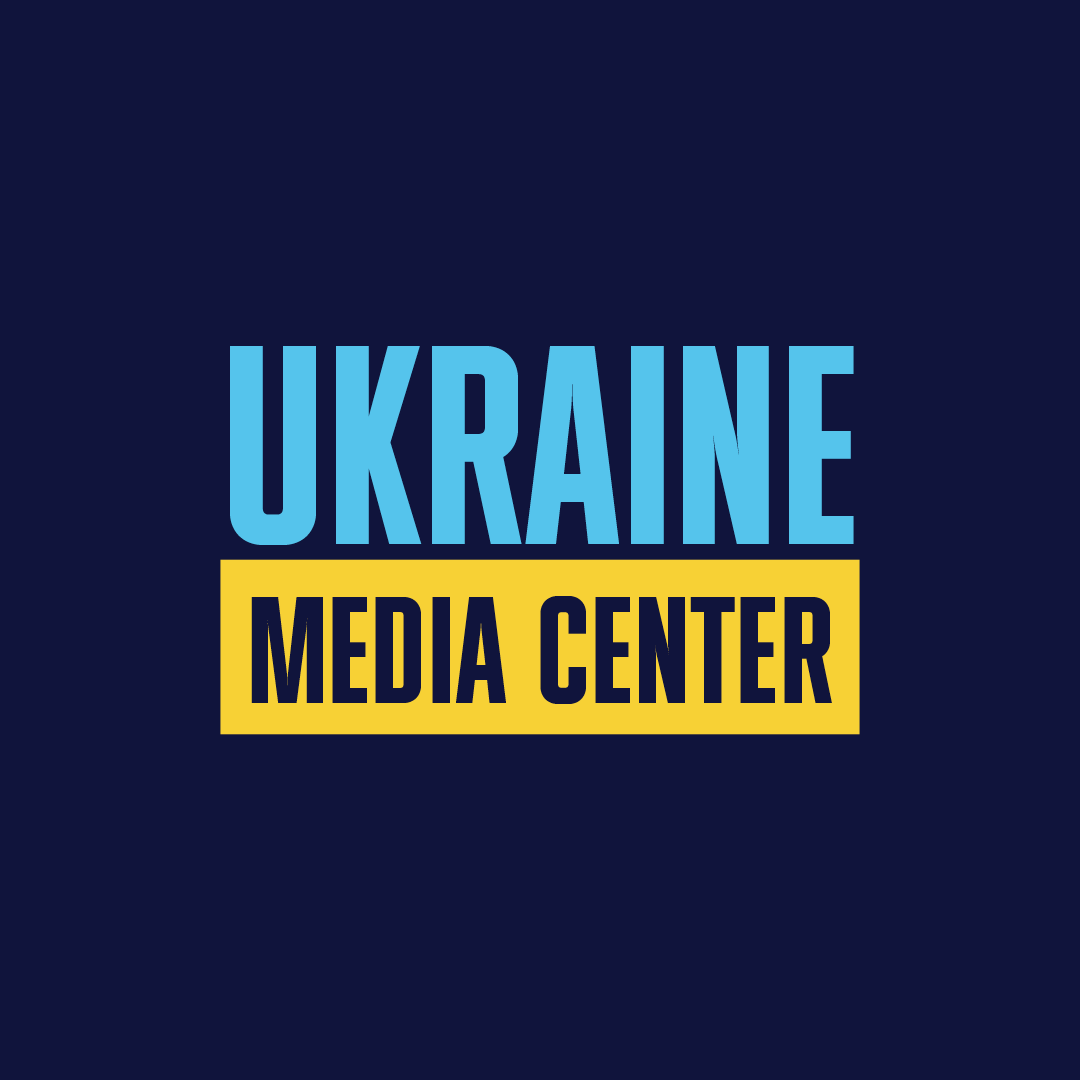
- Formation: March 14, 2022; 4 years ago
- Headquarters: Kyiv, 9 Borysa Hrinchenka St.
- Location: Ukraine
- Website: https://mediacenter.org.ua/

Media Center Ukraine (Ukrainian: Медіацентр Україна, romanized: Mediatsentr Ukraina) is a civic initiative that, after the start of the full-scale Russian invasion, united media professionals, the government, and the business community with a shared goal of telling the world about the war in Ukraine. Also, the Media Center offers a platform for organizing and hosting top newsworthy events.

== History ==
Media Center Ukraine was founded in March 2022 by media professionals, the government, and the business community to disseminate information about the course of the Russo-Ukrainian War and its consequences within Ukraine and internationally.

The first Media Center Ukraine sites were opened in Lviv and Kyiv, with initial briefings held on March 14, 2022. Similar centers were later set up in Kharkiv and Odesa.

As of 2024, Media Center Ukraine operates in Kyiv and Kharkiv.

=== Joint Project with Ukrinform ===
In April 2022, Media Center Ukraine partnered with Ukrinform to establish a unified press center in Kyiv. This collaboration aimed to integrate state resources with public initiatives, supporting Ukraine’s informational efforts during the war.

=== Partnership with Suspilne ===
In July 2024, Media Center Ukraine in Kyiv partnered with the Suspilne Public Broadcasting Company of Ukraine to launch the joint project “Suspilne Space.” As part of this partnership, the center relocated within Kyiv, where it continues to host briefings, meetings, discussions, and debates.

== Activities ==
Media Center Ukraine is a communication platform with a broad range of functions and activities, from developing strategies and networking to hosting newsworthy events.

=== Service Assistance for Journalists ===
It is a service unit focused on providing comprehensive assistance in many areas, from sorting out logistics to obtaining accreditation from the Ministry of Defense of Ukraine. During its first three months of operation, Media Center Ukraine assisted over 2,500 representatives of media organizations from different countries.

In 2023, the Media Center Ukraine team processed over 400 journalist inquiries.

=== Hosting Strategic Sessions and Informal Meetings ===
Media Center Ukraine uses various work formats, such as strategic sessions for communication campaigns and meetings with journalists and fixers hosted to exchange experiences and discuss challenges.

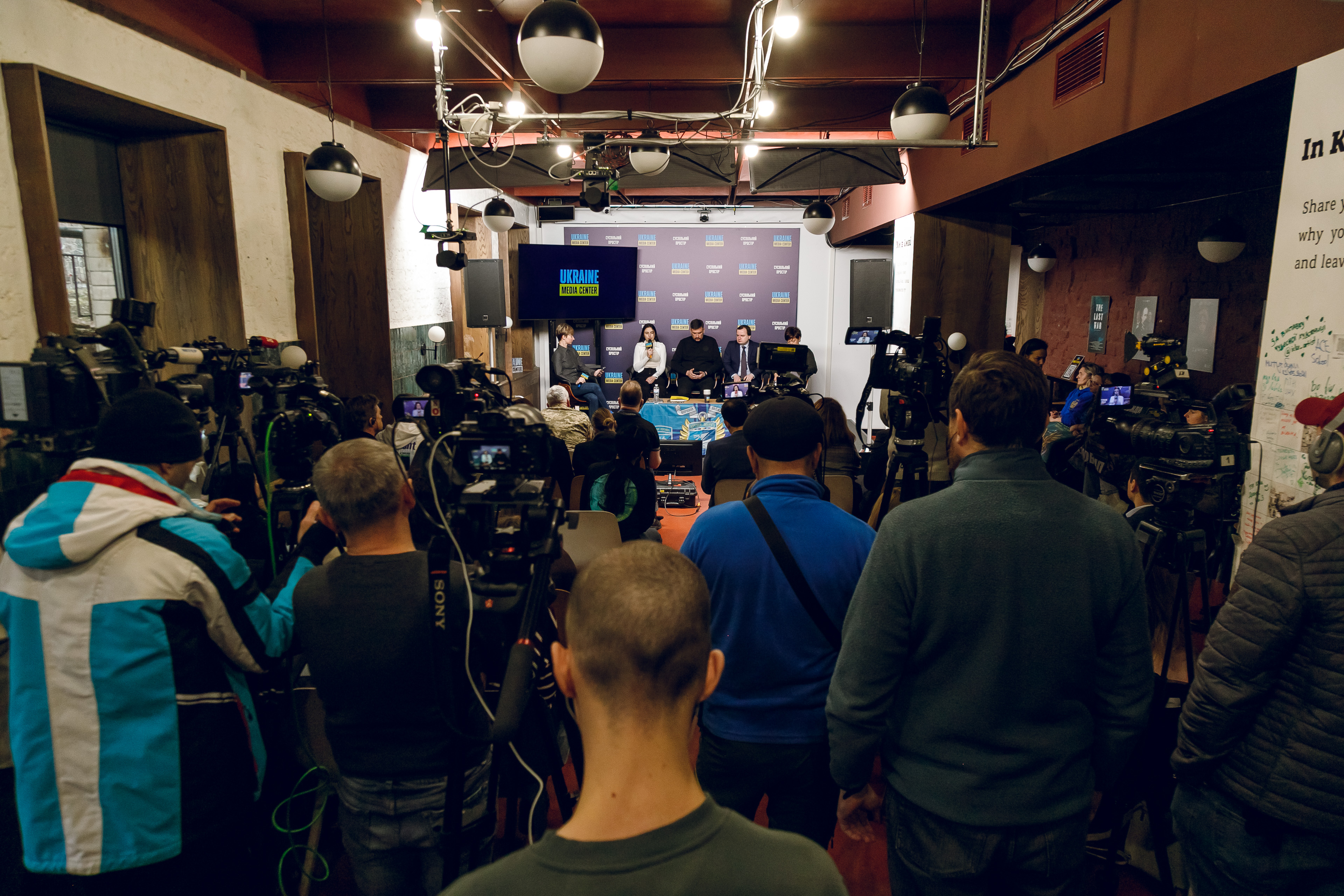
Event in Media Center Ukraine

Hosting so-called “orientation sessions” is another line of work – representatives of uniformed agencies, historians, and journalists with combat experience are invited to meet foreign journalists to contextualize the war’s causes and consequences and share specific advice about covering the war.

=== Holding Public and Private Events on Current Topics ===
Since its inception, Media Center Ukraine has been organizing press conferences, briefings, expert discussions, media tours, off-the-record meetings, and networking events for journalists and fixers. Nearly 4,000 foreign journalists have attended events organized by the Media Center.

=== Producer Department and Photo Bank ===
Media Center Ukraine facilitates inquiries from journalists, provides contact information for speakers, and identifies relevant topics for foreign media coverage. In 2023, its Producer Department processed over 800 journalist requests from journalists.

Additionally, Media Center Ukraine maintains a photo bank, offering free photo downloads for journalists to use in their materials.

=== Support for Civil Society ===
Supporting civil society and contributing to Ukraine’s recovery efforts has become a key focus for Media Center Ukraine. This includes organizing training and mentoring sessions, facilitating private discussions, and more. The Media Center team also assists civic organizations with event planning and provides media support.

=== Meme Museum ===
In June 2023, Media Center Ukraine launched the War Memes Museum – an English-language website that collects the most prominent memes of the war. The platform aims to show the global audience how Ukrainians, even in the country’s most difficult times, maintain their resilience and optimism.

== Speakers and Events ==
Ukraine’s top politicians and government officials visited the press center during its first three months of work – Ruslan Stefanchuk, Oleksandr Korniyenko, Oleksandr Tkachenko, Mykola Solskyy, Viktor Liashko, Serhiy Shkarlet, and others.

Media Center Ukraine offers an efficient communication platform for international institutions and their country offices, including the UN, WHO, European Commission, and others.

Speakers at events hosted by the Media Center Ukraine included Victoria Nuland, U.S. Deputy Secretary of State for Political Affairs (2021-2024); Viola Von Cramon, Member of the European Parliament; Linda Thomas-Greenfield, U.S. diplomat, U.S. Ambassador to the UN; Udo Bullmann, Member of the European Parliament; and Katarina Mathernova, EU Ambassador to Ukraine.

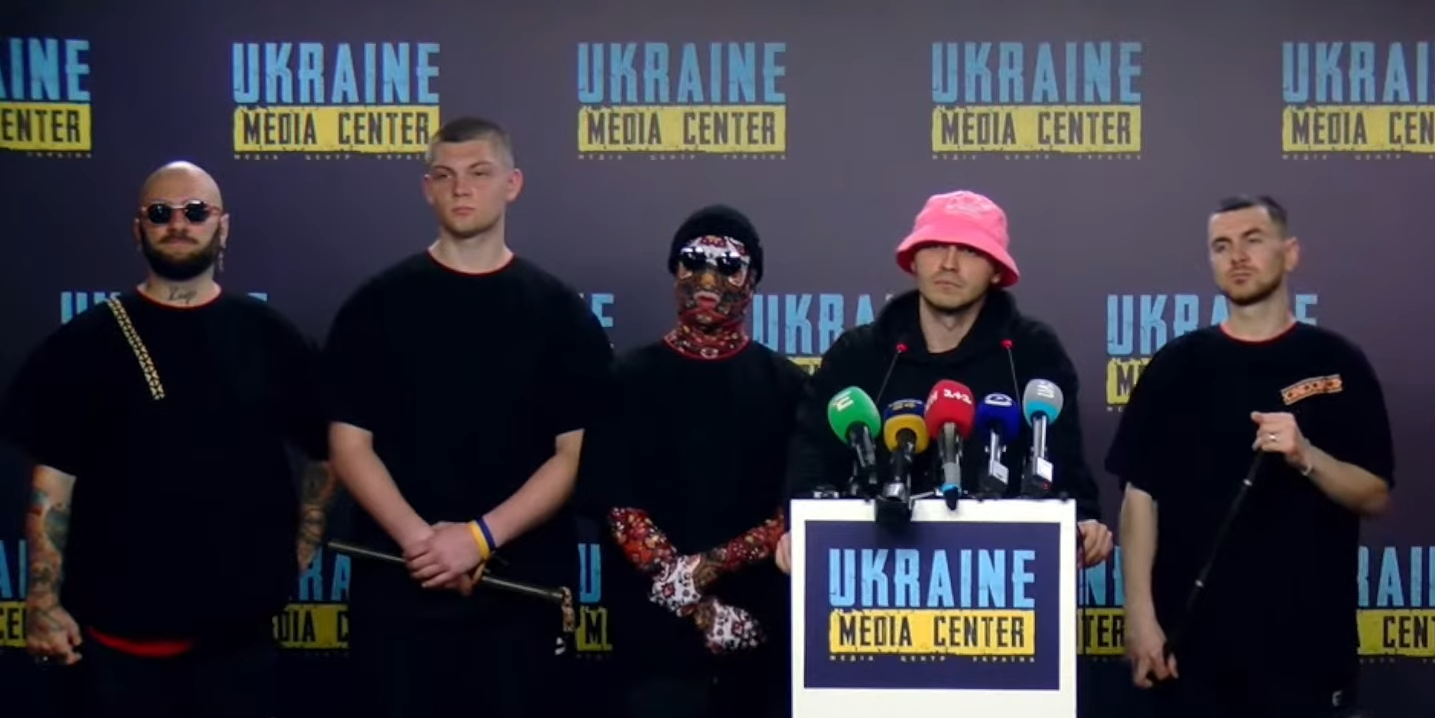
Kalush Orchestra at the Media Center Ukraine.

Kalush Orchestra – a Ukrainian band that won the Eurovision Song Contest 2022 – gave its first press conference after the victory in Media Center Ukraine.

In September 2023, a press conference was held at the Media Center Ukraine with Russian pilot Maksym Kuzminov, who, during the special operation “Synytsia,” flew a Russian Mi-8 helicopter to Ukrainian territory.

The Main Directorate of Intelligence of the Ministry of Defence of Ukraine held a press conference with prisoners of war who were mercenaries from Global South countries, recruited by Russia to participate in the war against Ukraine.

On January 20, 2025, the day of Donald Trump’s inauguration, Media Center Ukraine hosted a public discussion on expectations for the new U.S. president and Ukraine’s strategy. The event was attended by journalists from Ukrainian and international media, including Japanese NHK, Kyodo News, Austrian ORF, and others. Diplomats from the embassies of Canada, Poland, Slovakia, the United Kingdom, Romania, the Netherlands, Slovenia, Denmark, Bulgaria, and Hungary also participated in the event.

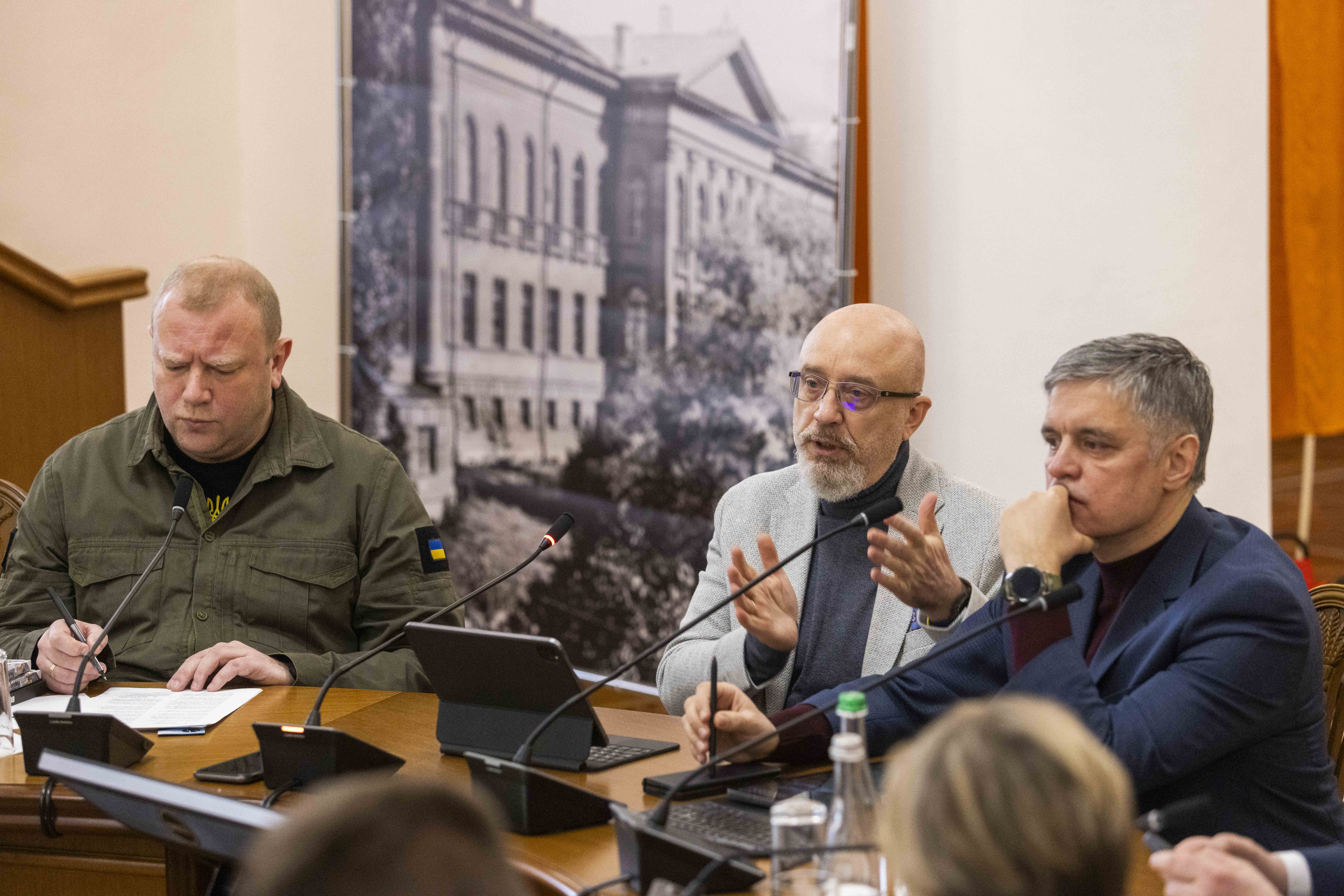
Orientation session for newly arrived diplomats organized by Media Center Ukraine

In February 2025, Media Center Ukraine, Taras Shevchenko National University of Kyiv, and the analytical center DREAM Hub jointly organized an orientation session for newly arrived diplomats. The event gathered approximately 70 representatives from embassies and diplomatic missions to discuss Ukraine’s key challenges. Speakers included prominent Ukrainian officials such as Oleksii Chernyshov, Oleksii Reznikov, Vadym Prystaiko, and Volodymyr Havrylov.

== Redkolegia ==
In August 2022, Media Center Ukraine, in collaboration with the innovation park Unit.City, organized the first industry event for the media community since the start of the full-scale war – Redkolegia.Offline. The event addressed the future of Ukraine’s media market and the challenges of operating during wartime.

Speakers included Mykhailo Podolyak, Advisor to the Head of the Presidential Office; Andriy Kulykov, journalist and host at Hromadske Radio; Borys Davidenko, Chief Editor of Forbes Ukraine; Vadym Denysenko, Executive Director of the Ukrainian Institute for the Future; Vadym Karpyak, ICTV host; among others.

Redkolegia is held two to three times a year and brings together Ukraine’s media community to discuss industry challenges, find solutions to pressing issues, and share insights.

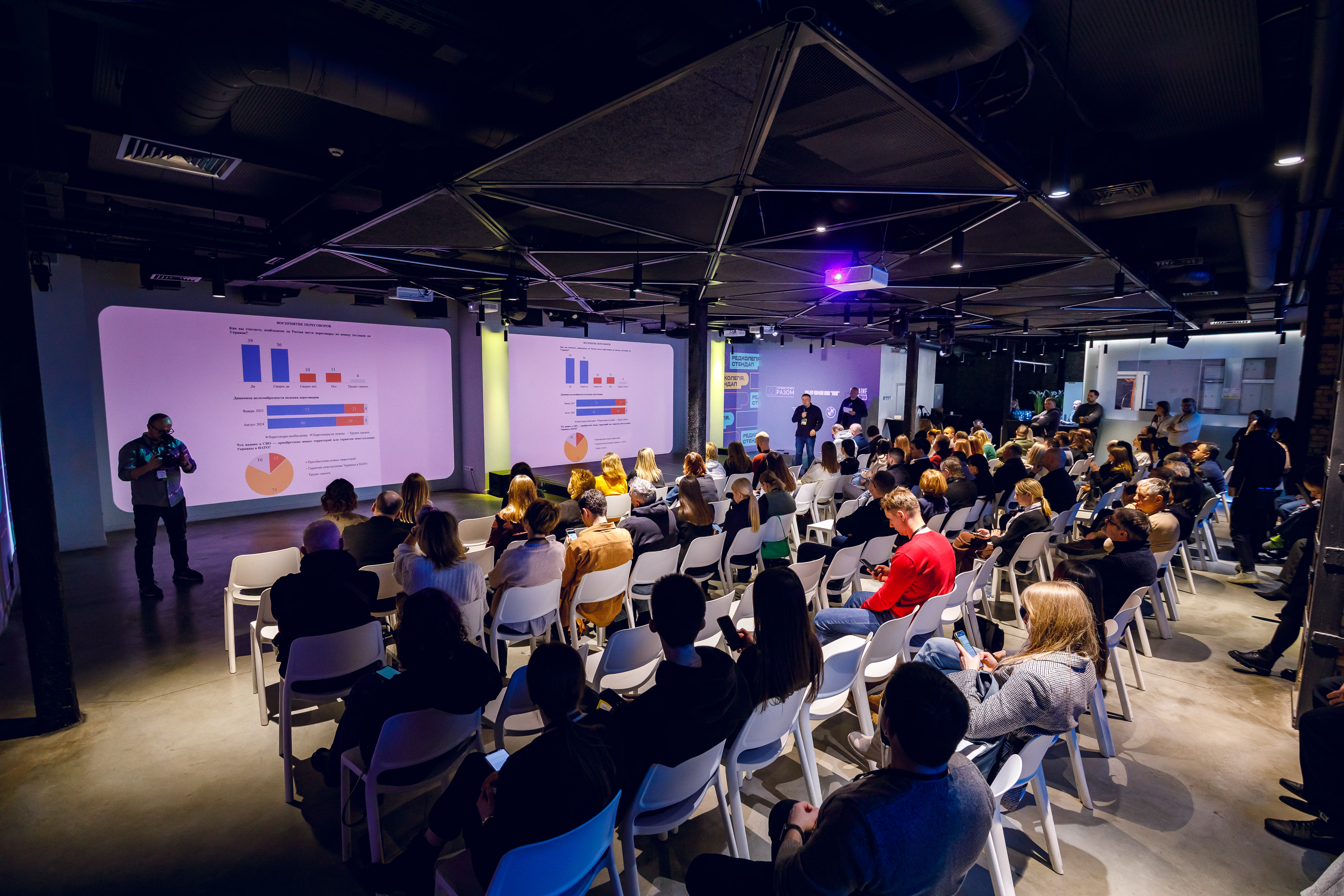
Redkolegia event

In September 2023, “Redkolegia.MeetUp” gathered over 300 participants from across the country, representing both national and local media outlets.

On October 2, 2024, Media Center Ukraine and Unit.City held the sixth “Redkolegia. Standup” featuring a standup-style format. Participants delivered talks and engaging in collective discussions about the current state of the media and communications sector. The event hosted more than 100 guests.

On February 19, 2025, the seventh “Redkolegia. Standup” event was held, bringing together over 120 journalists and media professionals. The event featured a lineup of speakers, including war photographers Kostiantyn and Vlada Liberov, meteorologist Natalka Didenko, sociologist Oleksii Antypovych, sports journalist and commentator Oleksandr Hlyvynskyi, and television producer Ivanna Naida.

== Mentions in media ==
Numerous Ukrainian and foreign media talked about Media Center Ukraine in their articles, including The New York Times, Rolling Stone, TSN, Hindustan News Hub, ArmyInform, etc.
