= Elena Zhosul =

Russian journalist and television presenter

- Born: September 16, 1980 (age 45); Chișinău, Moldavian Soviet Socialist Republic, USSR
- Education: Moscow State University named after M. V. Lomonosov
- Scientific career
- Fields: Political studies Media studies
- Workplaces: Russian Orthodox University of Saint John the Divine
- Thesis: Religious factor in the processes of political integration and disintegration in Europe (2008)
- Doctoral advisor: Alexander P. Kabachenko
- Website: pravoslavie.school/opk

Elena Victorovna Zhosul (Russian: Еле́на Ви́кторовна Жо́сул; born September 16, 1980, Chișinău, Moldavian Soviet Socialist Republic, USSR) is a Russian journalist, television presenter, political scientist and media expert.

She is a presenter of social and political talk show Do Samoj Suti (transl. To the Core; Russian: До самой сути) and talk show for Orthodox women Zhenskaja Polovina (transl. Women Moiety; Russian: Женская половина) on the first Russian public Orthodox TV channel "Spas" (since 2018). From 2005 to 2010 Zhosul was a correspondent and columnist for the news agency Interfax-Religion.

She has been a member of the Council of Chairman of the Department for Church's Society and Mass Mediа Relations (Russian Orthodox Church), a member of the Russian Orthodox Church Inter-Council Presence Commission on information activities of the Church and media relations (since 2015), and a Head of the Center for Media Communications of the Russian Orthodox University of Saint John the Divine (since 2016).

She was a candidate of Political Sciences, and from 2010 to 2016 was a Docent and Head of the Department of Journalism and Public Relations of the History and Philology Faculty of Russian Orthodox University of St. John the Divine.

She is a regular expert in various discussion platforms on religious and ethnic issues, expert of the non-profit research service Sreda, and an expert of the federal news agency Regions.ru.

== Biography ==
Born September 16, 1980, in Chișinău. Her father Victor Ivanovich Zhosu(l) (transl. Виктор Иванович Жо́су(л)) is theater expert, journalist, political analyst and political writer, graduated in 1988 from the theater department of Leningrad State Institute of Theater, Music and Cinema, from 1998 to 2001 was a member of the Parliament of the Republic of Moldova on the list of the electoral bloc Democratic Convention of Moldova, was secretary of the coordination council Social Democratic Party and vice chairman Moldova Revival and Consent Party, deputy chief editor of the newspaper Moldavskie Vedomosti, was the acting chief editor of the newspaper "Respublika", author of the monograph "On the way to the theater: from the history of theatrical construction in Moldova in the first years of Soviet power (1917–1924)” and compilation "Restore Unity: The Position of the Russian Orthodox Church on the Bessarabian Metropolitanate". Documents and materials".

In 2002–2004, worked as an analyst at the Center for Communication Technologies "Propaganda" (CCT "PRОПАГАНДА"). Since 2010 – Director of the Center for Humanitarian Projects "Axion".

In 2003 graduated from the Department of Political Science, Faculty of Philosophy, Moscow State University named after M.V. Lomonosov, then graduated from the graduate school in the Department of World and Russian Politics and in 2008, at the dissertation council D 501.001.47 at Moscow State University named after M. V. Lomonosov, under the scientific supervision of a Candidate of Philosophical Sciences, Docent Alexander P. Kabachenko defended her thesis for the degree of Candidate of Political Sciences on the topic "Religious factor in the processes of political integration and disintegration in Europe" (specialty 23.00.02 – political institutions, ethno-political conflictology, national and political processes and technologies), official opponents – Doctor of Historical Sciences, Professor Anatoly A. Krasikov and Candidate of Political Sciences Alexander V. Kynev, lead organization —. From 2010 to 2016 was a Docent and Head of the Department of Journalism and Public Relations of the History and Philology Faculty of the Russian Orthodox University of Saint John the Divine Since 2016 she is the Head of the Media Communication Center of the Russian Orthodox University of St. John the Divine. Currently, she is also developing her own educational project in the form of an online school of Orthodox culture Pravoslavie.School.

From 2005 to 2010 was a correspondent and columnist for the news agency Interfax-Religion. Since 2018 on the first Russian public Orthodox TV channel "Spas" she is a presenter of social and political talk show Do Samoj Suti (transl. До самой сути) and talk show for Orthodox women Zhenskaja Polovina (transl. Женская половина), also was co-host of political scientist and sociologist of religion Aleksandr Shchipkov in his show Shchipkov (transl. Щипков). She is a columnist for newspaper Pravoslavnaya Moskva (transl. Православная Москва), and author of articles in magazines Expert, Foma, newspapers Vatican Insider, Vedomosti, Argumenty i Fakty, and online newspaper Svobodnaya Pressa.

She is also a Council of Chairman of the Department for Church's Society and Mass Mediа Relations (Russian Orthodox Church) and she is a leacture of continuing education courses for church press officers at Department for Church's Society and Mass Mediа Relations. Since 2015 is a member of the Russian Orthodox Church Inter-Council Presence Commission on information activities of the Church and media relations. She is a member of Section Media at the Russian Art Union.

== Works ==
Scientific

- Жосул Е. В. Универсализм в социально-политической доктрине Католической церкви // Материалы международной научно-практической конференции студентов, аспирантов и молодых учёных "Ломоносов-2003". — М.: Издательство МГУ, 2003.
- Жосул Е. В. Роль религиозного фактора в процессе политической интеграции в Западной Европе // Плехановские чтения: сборник материалов международной конференции. — Нижневартовск, 2004.
- Жосул Е. В. Политологический аспект чина патриаршей интронизации (история и современное состояние)// Материалы докладов XVI Международной конференции студентов, аспирантов и молодых учёных "Ломоносов" / Отв. ред. И. А. Алешковский, П. Н. Костылев, А. И. Андреев. — М.: МАКС-Пресс, 2009. — 1 электрон. опт. диск (CD-ROM). С. 19–20.
- Жосул Е. В. Ватикан и европейская интеграция // Власть. — 2008. — No. 11. — С. 73–77. ISSN 2071-5358
- Жосул Е. В. Политологический аспект чина патриаршей интронизации (история и современное состояние) // Материалы докладов XVI Международной конференции студентов, аспирантов и молодых учёных «Ломоносов» / Отв. ред. И. А. Алешковский, П. Н. Костылев, А. И. Андреев. — М.: МАКС-Пресс, 2009. — 1 электрон. опт. диск (CD-ROM). С. 19–20.
- Жосул Е. В. Realpolitik патриарха Кирилла // Русское время. No.1 (2) (январь-март 2010)
- Жосул Е. В. Религия и единая Европа. Цивилизационный анализ европейской интеграции. LAP LAMBERT Academic Publishing, 2011. — 156 с. ISBN 978-3-8433-1379-7
- Жосул Е. В. Предисловие // Щипков А. В. Религиозное измерение журналистики. — М.: ПРОБЕЛ-2000, 2014. — С. 7–9. — 272 с. 500 экз. ISBN 978-5-98604-436-1
- Zhosul E. V. Christianity and Mass-Media after Socialism // Religious Impact on Journalistic Cultures. Reading Materials / V. M. Khroul (ed.). — Moscow: Lomonosov Moscow State University Faculty of Journalism, Moscow University Press. — Vol. 2. — P. 9–12. — (Media and Religion). — ISBN 978-5-19-011016-6.
- Жосул Е. В. Ватикан в социальных сетях: католический опыт SMM-политики Archived September 4, 2019, at the Wayback Machine // Научный богословский портал Богослов.ру, July 19, 2017

Journalistic

- Жосул Е. В. Экуменический маршрут по следам крестовых походов // Интерфакс-Религия, November 27, 2006
- Жосул Е. В. Россия и Святой Престол: новый акцент дипломатического диалога // Интерфакс-Религия, March 12, 2007
- Жосул Е. В. Америка выбирает президента: вера и политика // Интерфакс-Религия, November 4, 2008
- Жосул Е. В. Царьградский марш перед украинской рапсодией // Интерфакс-Религия, June 8, 2009
- Жосул Е. В. Наш патриарх — колонизатор? // Интерфакс-Религия, August 2, 2009
- Жосул Е. В. Ядерное православие // Интерфакс-Религия, August 24, 2009
- Жосул Е. В. Белорусский урок. Познаётся в сравнении // Интерфакс-Религия, September 30, 2009
- Жосул Е. В. Небо, самолёт, Патриарх // Интерфакс-Религия, January 19, 2010
- Жосул Е. В. Арарат виден при ясной погоде // Интерфакс-Религия, March 21, 2010
- Жосул Е. В. Между шезлонгом и часовней // Интерфакс-Религия, April 13, 2010
- Жосул Е. В. Небоскребы, небоскребы, а храм маленький такой // Интерфакс-Религия, April 21, 2010
- Жосул Е. В. Церковь-мама // Интерфакс-Религия, July 25, 2010
- Жосул Е. В. Быль и бытие Чернобыля // Эксперт, April 28, 2011
- Жосул Е. В. Есть ли у нас время на игру в бисер? // Эксперт, July 8, 2011
- Жосул Е. В. Любовь вне зависимостей // Эксперт, August 4, 2011
- Жосул Е. В. Матрица: корректировка // Эксперт, January 24, 2012
- Елена Жосул: студент на приходе // Татьянин день, October 24, 2012
- Zhosul E. V. El papel de la mujer no nos divide // Vatican Insider, September 24, 2013
- Жосул Е. В. Остра украинская боль // Православная Москва, June 24, 2014
- Жосул Е. В. Красота Божиего мира. Как постичь Веру // Аргументы и факты — СтоЛичность. — 2014. — No. 4 (53) за 9 апреля. — С. 5.
- Жосул Е. В. Красный волк с белым ягнёнком // Эксперт, January 2, 2015
- Жосул Е. В. Встань и говори // Фома, February 4, 2015
- Жосул Е. В. Следующий #jesuis: очередь и кастинг // Однако, March 3, 2015
- Жосул Е. В. Марфа, Марфа, отложи смартфон // Православная Москва, April 26, 2015
- Жосул Е. В. Моё открытие Татианы // Православная Москва, January 25, 2016
- Жосул Е. В. В графе поставить крест // Эксперт, February 9, 2016
- Жосул Е. В. Всеправославная нить Ариадны // Эксперт, June 20, 2016
- Жосул Е. В. #ГоворитьБожиюПравду // Фома. Ноябрь 2016. No. 11 (163).
- Жосул Е. В. На посту // Православная Москва. No. 22 (611) ноябрь, 2016 г.
- Жосул Е. В. Шампанское без пепла // Православная Москва. No. 23 (613) декабрь, 2016 г.
- Жосул Е. В. Весёлыми ногами // Православная Москва. No. 8 (621) апрель, 2017 г.
- Жосул Е. В. Оглашенное большинство // Православная Москва. No. 15 (628) август, 2017 г.
- Жосул Е. В. Привет, ромашки! И подвиньтесь // Свободная пресса, June 28, 2017
- Жосул Е. В. Безответственная милостыня // Православная Москва. No. 17 (630) сентябрь, 2017 г.
- Жосул Е. В. Феромоны смерти // Православная Москва. No. 21 (634) ноябрь, 2017 г.
- Жосул Е. В. Сеанс душевного маникюра // Православная Москва. No. 22 (635) ноябрь, 2017 г.
- Жосул Е. В. Перформансом по живому // Свободная пресса, December 8, 2017
- Жосул Е. В. Со скелетом по течению // Православная Москва. No. 3 (640) февраль, 2018 г.
- Жосул Е. В. Мусорный ветер // Православная Москва, May 4, 2018
- Жосул Е. В. Звезда по имени пенсия // Православная Москва. No. 15-16 (652–653) август 2018 года
- Жосул Е. В. До самой сути 2018–го // Православная Москва 20–24 (657–660) ноябрь-декабрь 2018 г.

== General sources ==
- Khroul, V. M. (2017). "Christian Media in Russia in the Age of 'Networkization'" (PDF). World of Media. Journal of Russian Media and Journalism Studies. Национальная ассоциация масс-медиа исследователей: 121–142.
- Khroul, V. M. (2018). "Religious Media Dynamics in Russia after 'Perestroika' (1991—2017)" (PDF). Kultura – Media – Teologia (33). Warszawa: Wydział Teologiczny Uniwersytetu Kardynała Stefana Wyszyńskiego w Warszawie: 39–62. ISSN 2081-8971.
- Knorre, B. K. [in Russian]; Kharish, T. I. (2017). "Political Language of the Church in the Post-Soviet Period". KnE Social Sciences / Convention 2017 "Modernization and Multiple Modernities" (ISPS Convention 2017). 3 (7). KnE Publishing: 365–383. doi:10.18502/kss.v3i7.2488. hdl:10995/82935.
