= Sergei Perevezentsev =

- Сергей Перевезенцев
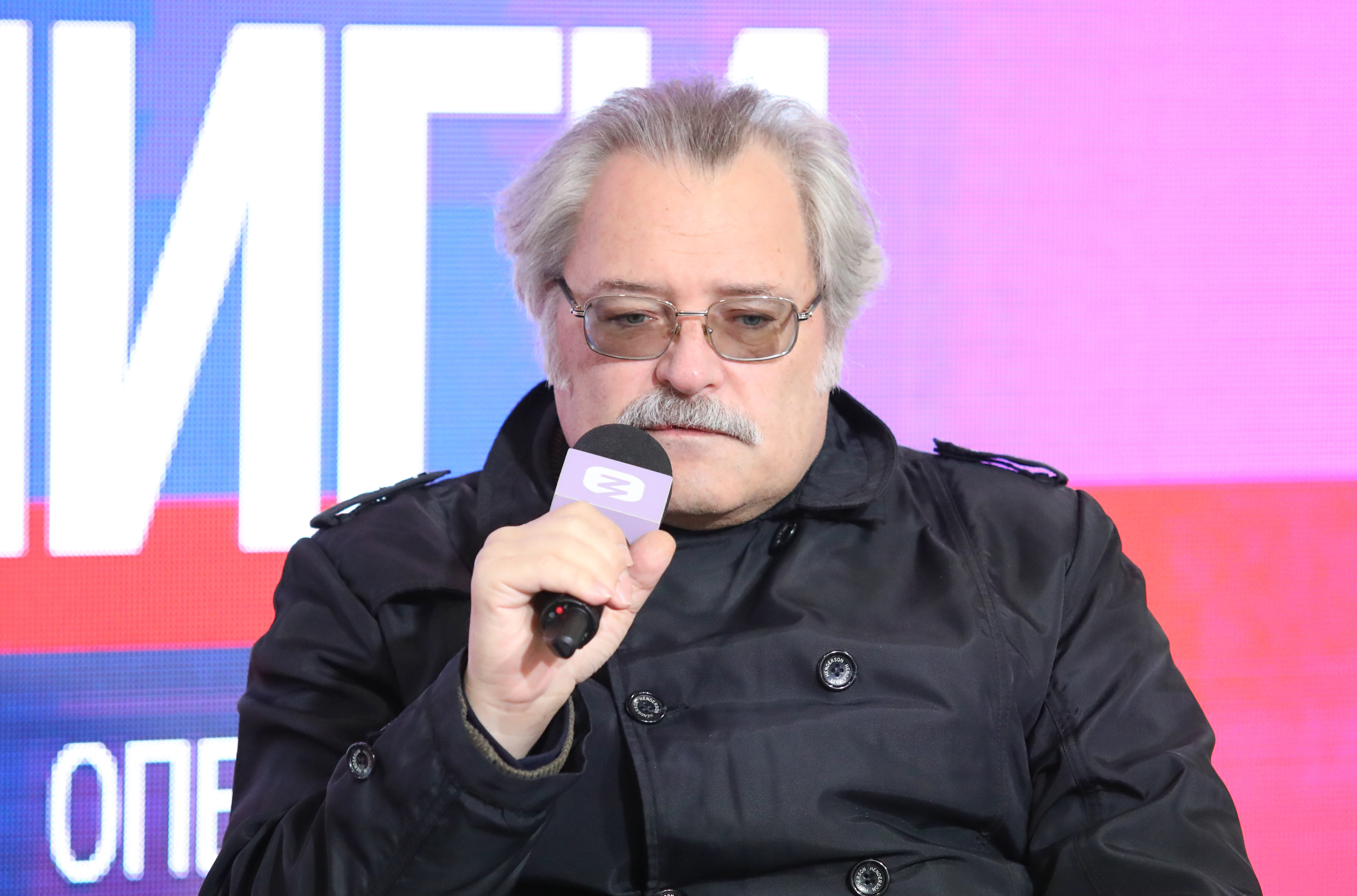
- Perevezentsev in 2023
- Born: 29 January 1960 (age 66); Tuchkovo, Moscow Oblast, Soviet Union
- Citizenship: Russia
- Education: Moscow Lenin State Pedagogical Institute
- Awards: Great Literature Prize of Russia
- Scientific career
- Fields: Political science, history
- Workplaces: Moscow State University; Russian Orthodox University
- Academic advisors: Apollon Kuzmin

Sergei Vyacheslavovich Perevezentsev (Russian: Сергей Вячеславович Перевезенцев; born January 29, 1960, in Tuchkovo, Moscow Oblast) is a Russian historian and philosopher, writer, and conservative publicist. He is a Doctor of Historical Sciences, Professor in the Political Science Department of the Moscow State University, co-chairman of the board of the Union of Writers of Russia, and a laureate of several literary awards.

== Biography ==
In 1982, he graduated from the History Department of the Moscow Lenin State Pedagogical Institute (now Moscow State Pedagogical University), where he studied under Apollon Kuzmin. Until 1985, he worked as a school teacher. He then worked in publishing (publishing houses Molodaya Gvardiya and Zvonnitsa-MG, and the magazines Detskaya Roman-Gazeta and Roman-Zhurnal XXI Vek).

In 1990, he defended his PhD dissertation, "The Ideological Sources of the Historical and Philosophical Views of V. N. Tatishchev". He defended his doctoral dissertation, "The Historical Fate of Russia in the Works of Russian Thinkers of the 11th-17th Centuries" in 1999.

Since 1995, he has been a member of the Union of Writers of Russia; since 1999, he has been the Secretary of the Board; since 2004, he has been the co-chairman of the Board of the Union of Writers of Russia. Since 2004, he has been a part-time professor in the Department of the History of Socio-Political Doctrines in the Philosophy Faculty at the Moscow State University. Since 2008, he has been a part-time professor in the Department of the History of Socio-Political Doctrines in the Political Science Faculty at the Moscow State University.

From 2012 to 2016, he served as a part-time dean of the Faculty of History and Philology at the Russian Orthodox University (Moscow Orthodox Institute of St. John the Theologian).

From 2013 to 2015, he was editor-in-chief of the journal "Historical Education" and the web portal "Tezis.ru: Humanitarian Discussions".

Perevezentsev is a member of the leadership of the World Russian People's Council (member of the Bureau of the Presidium) and is a member of various public organizations (full member of the Imperial Orthodox Palestine Society, full member of the Philosophical and Economic Assembly, etc.).

His wife is the author of textbooks and teaching aids on Russian history, Tatyana Vladimirovna Perevezentseva.

== Academic research ==
He has published over 500 articles and over 50 books. He is the author (with his wife Tatyana Perevezentseva) of textbooks and a teaching aid on Russian history for grades 6–11 in comprehensive schools. He is also the author, co-author, compiler, and editor of several textbooks, anthologies, and anthologies for higher education institutions.

In his scholarly and journalistic works, Perevezentsev substantiates the uniqueness and independence of Russian civilization, explores the methodology of the Orthodox understanding of history, and reveals the semantic content of various historical processes and events. He introduced the concept of the "spiritual factor of historical development" and proposed taking it into account when analyzing the causes of historical phenomena, along with other factors (economic, political, social, natural and climatic, etc.). He developed the concept of spiritual-political thought, according to which the study of Russian socio-political doctrines should be conducted through the prism of their spiritual (religious) content and purpose. Based on this concept, Perevezentsev developed the course "History of Sociopolitical Doctrines of Russia in the 10th-18th Centuries," as well as several specialized courses taught to political science students. Under his supervision, seven candidate dissertations were defended in the fields of "Theory of Politics, History and Methodology of Political Science," and "Russian History".

Perevezentsev's works, including the articles "The Collapse of Humanism," "The Russian Choice: Fundamental Ideals of National Identity," "When History Will No Longer Exist," "The Russian Way of Sadness," and others, have been repeatedly published in various print and online publications and have become the subject of public discussion.

Perevezentsev's stories and novellas have been published in the magazines Nash Sovremennik, "Roman-Zhurnal XXI Vek," "Podyom," "Sever," "Nizhny Novgorod", "Bezhin Lug", "Ochag", "Detskaya Roman-Gazeta" and others, as well as in the newspaper "Literaturnaya Rossiya", and have also been published as a separate book ("Do We Need This?..: Novels and Stories"). His fictional historical narratives for children have also been published separately: "Ancient Rus'. The History of the Russian People from the 1st to the 9th Century," "Ivan the Terrible", "Moscow Saints", "The Century of Revolutions and Favorites", "Mikhail Lomonosov" and "Alexander II the Liberator".

He is a proponent of Anti-Normanism. According to Perevezentsev (2005), Apollon Kuzmin "believed that 'pure science' is too 'narrow' an undertaking". "The main task of a scholar is to serve his Fatherland, to be a citizen and a patriot". In 2010, the works of Perevezentsev, Apollon Kuzmin, A. N. Sakharov, L. P. Grot, Vyacheslav Fomin, and Natalia Ilyina (wife of the philosopher Ivan Ilyin) were published in the collection "The Expulsion of the Normans from Russian History". The annotation states: "The published works... reveal the true origins of Rus', tendentiously interpreted by Normanists".
