= Reaction of Russian intelligentsia to the 2014 annexation of Crimea =

Russian intelligentsia expressed various reactions to the Russian annexation of Crimea.

== Supporting the annexation ==
=== First letter of support ===
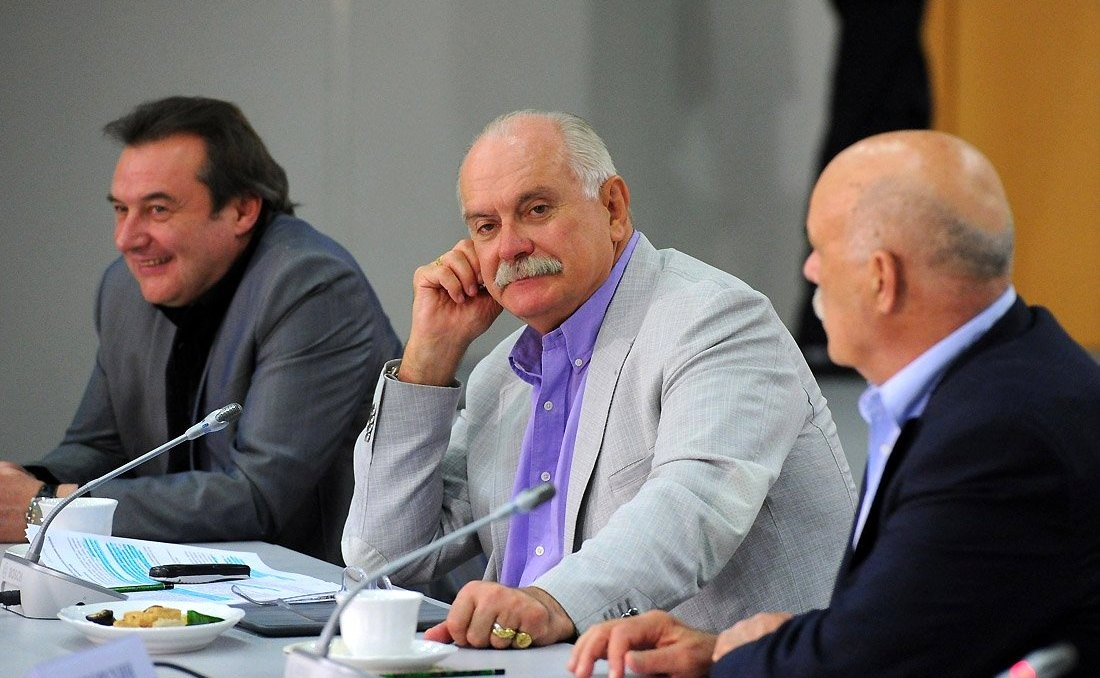
Director Nikita Mikhalkov, winner of the Academy Award for Best Foreign Language Film, was among those blacklisted by Ukraine for supporting the annexation.

Over 100 cultural figures signed a letter supporting Russia's return of Crimea. Among those who signed it were conductor Yuri Bashmet, film director Fyodor Bondarchuk, director Stanislav Govorukhin, film director Karen Shakhnazarov, actor Sergey Bezrukov, singer Lev Leshchenko, sculptor Alexander Bourganov, sculptor Zurab Tsereteli, and actor Dmitry Kharatyan.

The letter was kept open to add signatures and eventually reached 511.

=== Reaction to the letter ===
The name of the famous theatre and film director Mark Zakharov appeared on a petition opposing Russian accession of Crimea, however, he himself denied ever signing it. He stated in an interview that he opposed Russian soldiers being deployed to Ukraine as it reminded him the start of the Afghanistan conflict, however, he also couldn't imagine Russia without Crimea. He also stated that had he been offered to sign a letter supporting the accession, he would've signed it.

Director and actor Vladimir Menshov, winner of the Academy Award for Best Foreign Language Film, expressed support of the annexation by stating, "Finally Russia has moved from words to actions." He was blacklisted in Ukraine as a result.

Other prominent figures to support the annexation of Crimea and as a result getting blacklisted in Ukraine were actress Irina Alfyorova, singer Yuri Loza, actor Valentin Gaft, comedian Mikhail Zadornov, and winner of the Academy Award for Best Foreign Language Film director Nikita Mikhalkov.

Director Alexander Mitta expressed support of the return of Crimea to Russia; however, Mitta also said that he didn't like the fact that it was used as a way to distract the Russian population of the internal problems Russia was facing.

=== Rock musicians in support of the annexation ===
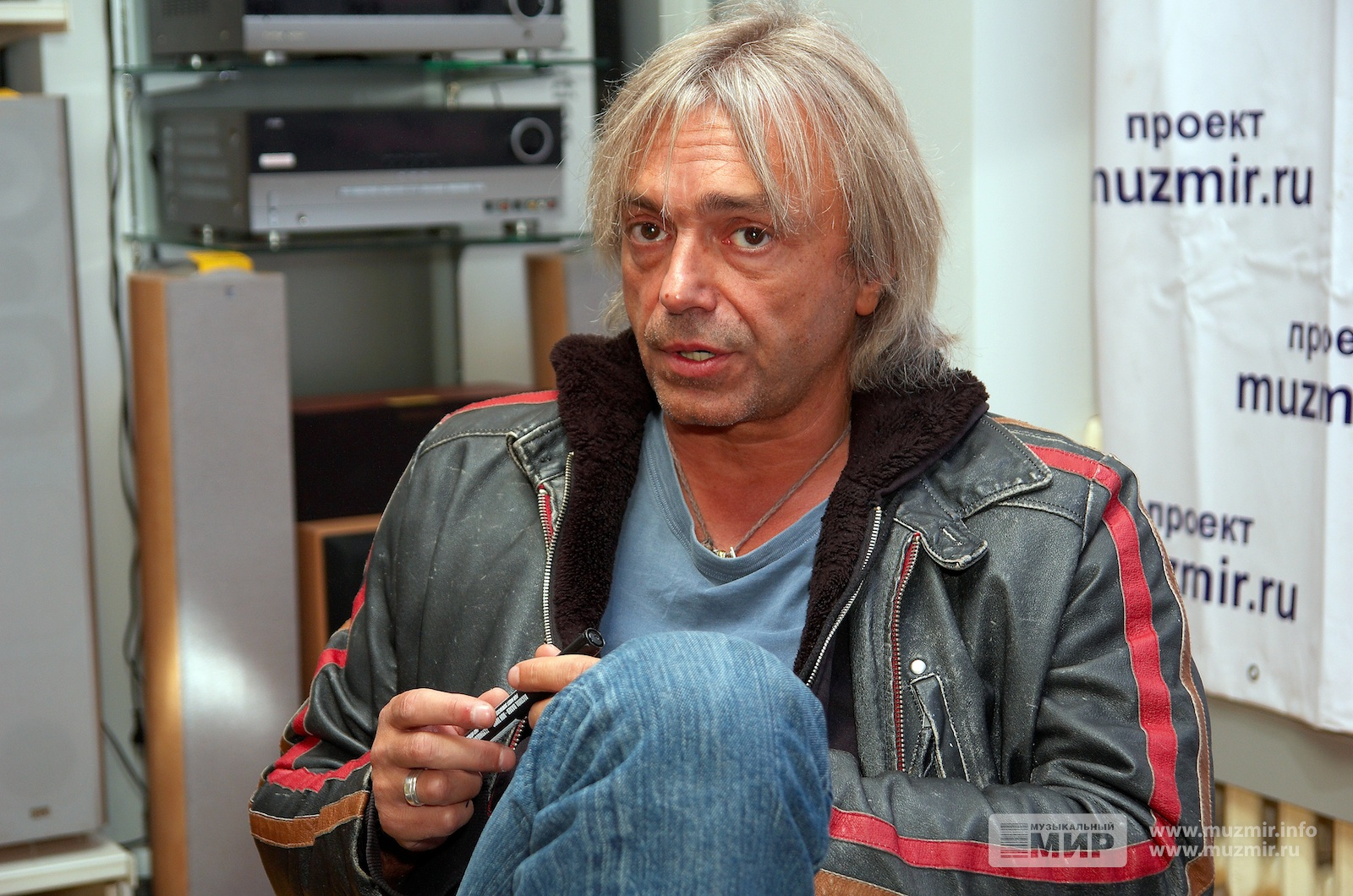
Konstantin Kinchev was one of the musicians to express support of the annexation.

The annexation of Crimea divided the Russian rock community to supporters and opposition to the move. Former Aria leader and current leader of the band Kipelov, Valery Kipelov, expressed support of the annexation, and stated that it should've been done in 1991. He performed at music festivals celebrating the event in Crimea.

Konstantin Kinchev and his band Alisa, considered to be among the pioneers of Russian rock, expressed support of the move, and cancelled all of his concerts in Ukraine. Kinchev had already expressed views supporting the return of Crimea to Russia in 2008.

Among the other prominent figures in Russian rock who expressed support of the move included Chaif, Chicherina, Alexander F. Sklyar, and Vadim Samoylov (ex-Agatha Christie).

Many rock concerts have been organised in Crimea following the annexation.

== Opposing the annexation ==
=== First letter of protest ===
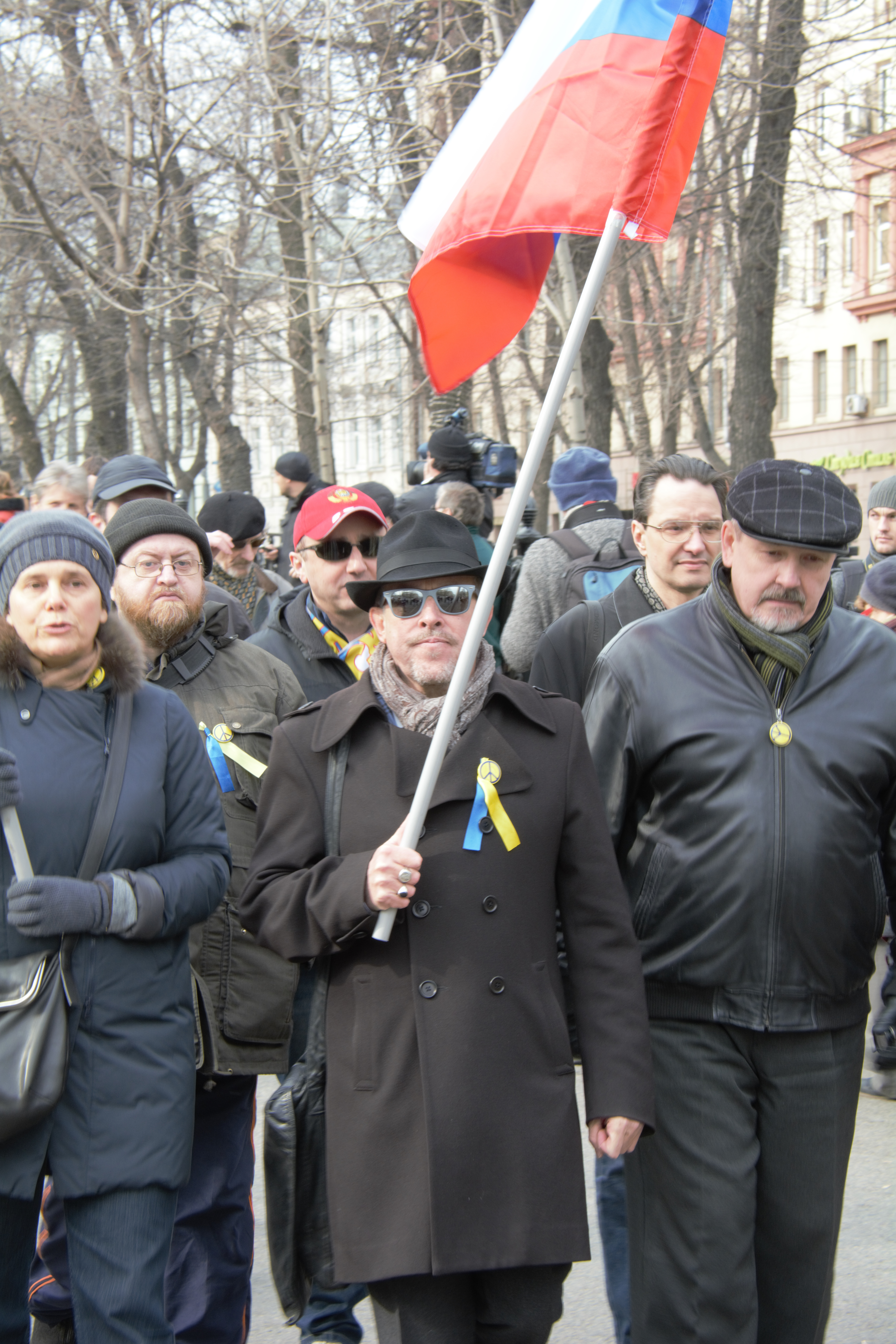
Andrey Makarevich participating in the 2014 anti-war march in Moscow

Russian scientists and artists who disagreed with Russian government policy in Crimea, announced their opposition in an open letter:

"Our country has been plunged into a dangerous adventure. Under the slogan "Defend the Russian in Crimea, as well as all Ukrainians from the new illegitimate, fascist government in Ukraine!", an actual annexation of the Crimea has already happened. International law was heavily violated and principles of European security and stability were destroyed. Russia is rapidly slipping into a new Cold War with the West and there are dangerous consequences that cannot be predicted."

"There is unrestrained flow of lies and disinformation in all Russian state media resources, as well as deafening propaganda campaign against anyone who tries to doubt the legitimacy of the authorities' actions or indicate their disastrous consequences for the country and people. All who disagree indiscriminately get called a "fifth column" and "fascists". There are a lot of people who disagree. It is enough to read uncensored media or numerous judgments in social networks to see that political scientists, economists, people who are professionally related to foreign policy, or just people that are endowed with any social intuition are warning that Russia is coming to a real catastrophe — economic, political, humanitarian."

The letter was published in "Echo of Moscow", "Novaya Gazeta" and "Russian PEN Center".

=== "Do not cave in. Do not succumb to lies" ===
Another open letter headlined "Do not cave in. Do not succumb to lies" was signed by 180 representatives of different professions, including: Yuri Ryzhov (of the Russian Academy of Science), Andrey Makarevich (musician), Yuri Shevchuk (musician), Andrey Zvyagintsev (film director), Marietta Chudakova (writer, literary historian) and Vadim Zakharov (artist).

=== Anti-war Congress ===
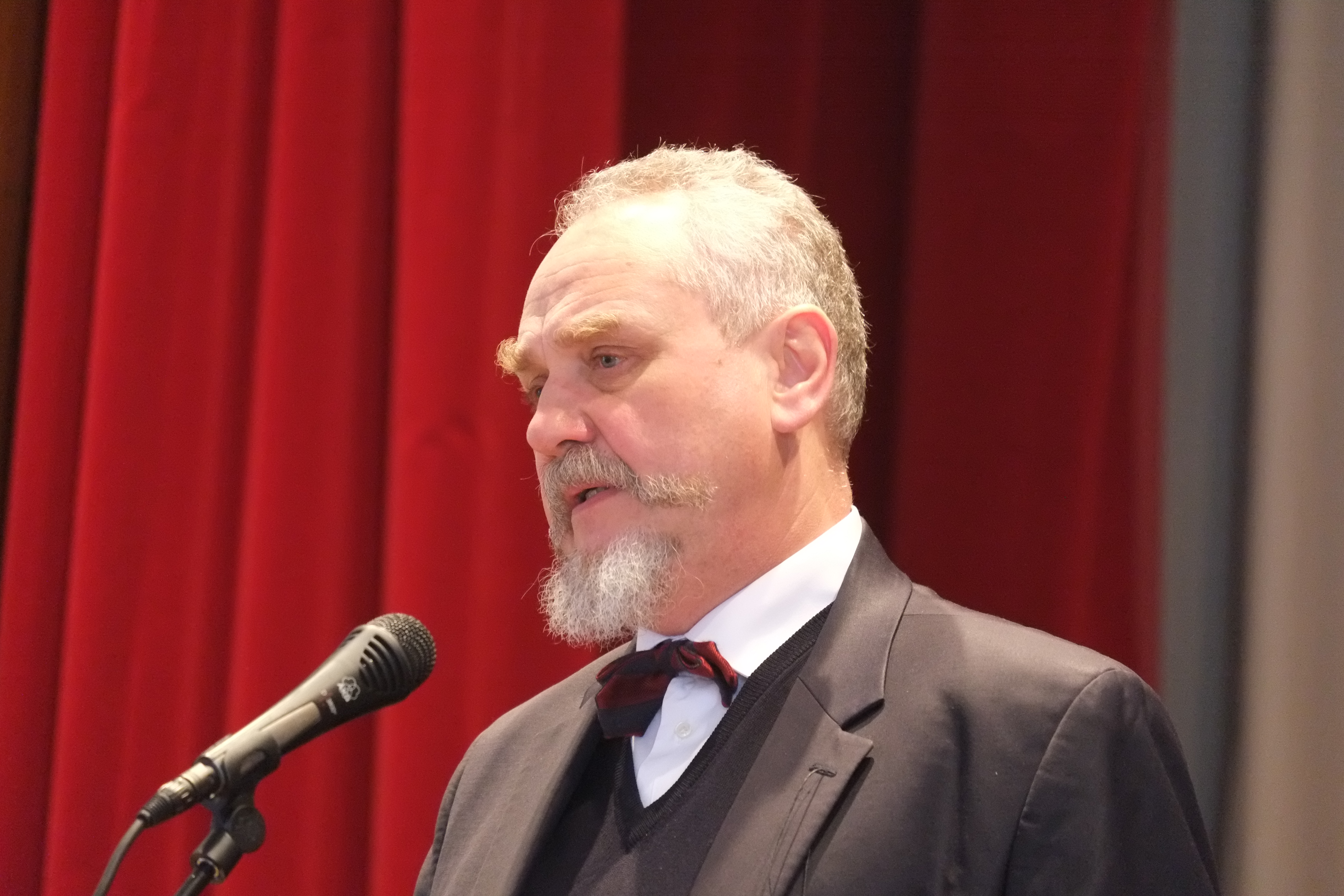
Professor Andrey Zubov at the Anti-war Congress

On March 19, 2014, an "Anti-war Congress" took place at the M.I. Rudomino State Library for Foreign Literature. An appeal, adopted by resolution of the Congress, stated:

"We, the representatives of the Russian intelligentsia, must warn the government about the historical mistake that is happening — the desire of taking under control part of another, recently brotherly Ukraine, by using Russian armed forces."

Sergei Markov, a member of Civic Chamber of the Russian Federation, commented on the results of the congress and called its participants "representatives of a "Russophobic" subculture that do not pose any danger to the country".

=== KinoSoyuz letter ===
On March 12, 2014, KinoSoyuz (an organization of the Russian film industry) published an open letter of support for their Ukrainian colleagues on its website. By 13 March 2014, the letter had been co-signed by more than 200 people.

== Individual opinions ==
- On March 1, 2014, the newspaper Vedomosti published an article entitled "It has already happened", in which historian Andrey Zubov, drew parallels with the Nazi occupation of Austria in 1938.
- On March 12, 2014, in an interview on "TV Rain", director of "Estrada Theater" Gennady Khazanov and the president of the Documentary Film Festival Vitaly Mansky, shared their thoughts about support or disagreement with Russian government policy.
- March 24, 2014 musician Andrey Makarevich and director Vladimir Bortko, expressed opposing views on the annexation of Crimea, when answering the "Reporter" online newspaper journalists' questions.
- Director Alexander Sokurov made another letter of support for Ukraine.

== Responses ==
=== Support for Russian policy ===
After an open letter of support for Russian policy in Crimea was published, on March 11, 2014, a response from Ukraine appeared.

- A Denis Matsuyev concert In Kyiv was canceled.
- Musician Yuri Bashmet was deprived of title of Honorary Professor at the Lviv Conservatory.

=== Opposition to Russian policy ===
- Professor and historian Andrey Zubov was fired from the Moscow State Institute of International Relations for an article in which he criticized Russian policy in Ukraine.
- On March 15, 2014, Andrey Makarevich took part in the Moscow "March of Peace". There was subsequently a proposal to strip Makarevich of his Order "For Merit to the Fatherland" for participation in the march. Moskovsky Komsomolets devoted several articles to the topic.
- In May, 2014, criminal proceedings were initiated against Russian poet Alexander Byvshev for writing poems that support Ukraine.
- A bill was introduced in the State Duma promising heavier penalties for violation of order during public events or promoting such events. Human rights activist Lev Ponomaryov suggested that the bill was a response to the Moscow "March of Peace".

== See also ==
- Media portrayal of the Russo-Ukrainian War
- Russian opposition
- Crimean consensus
