= 2014 anti-war protests in Russia =

2014 protest in Russia against military intervention in Ukraine

- Part of the annexation of Crimea by the Russian Federation and Russian opposition protest rallies
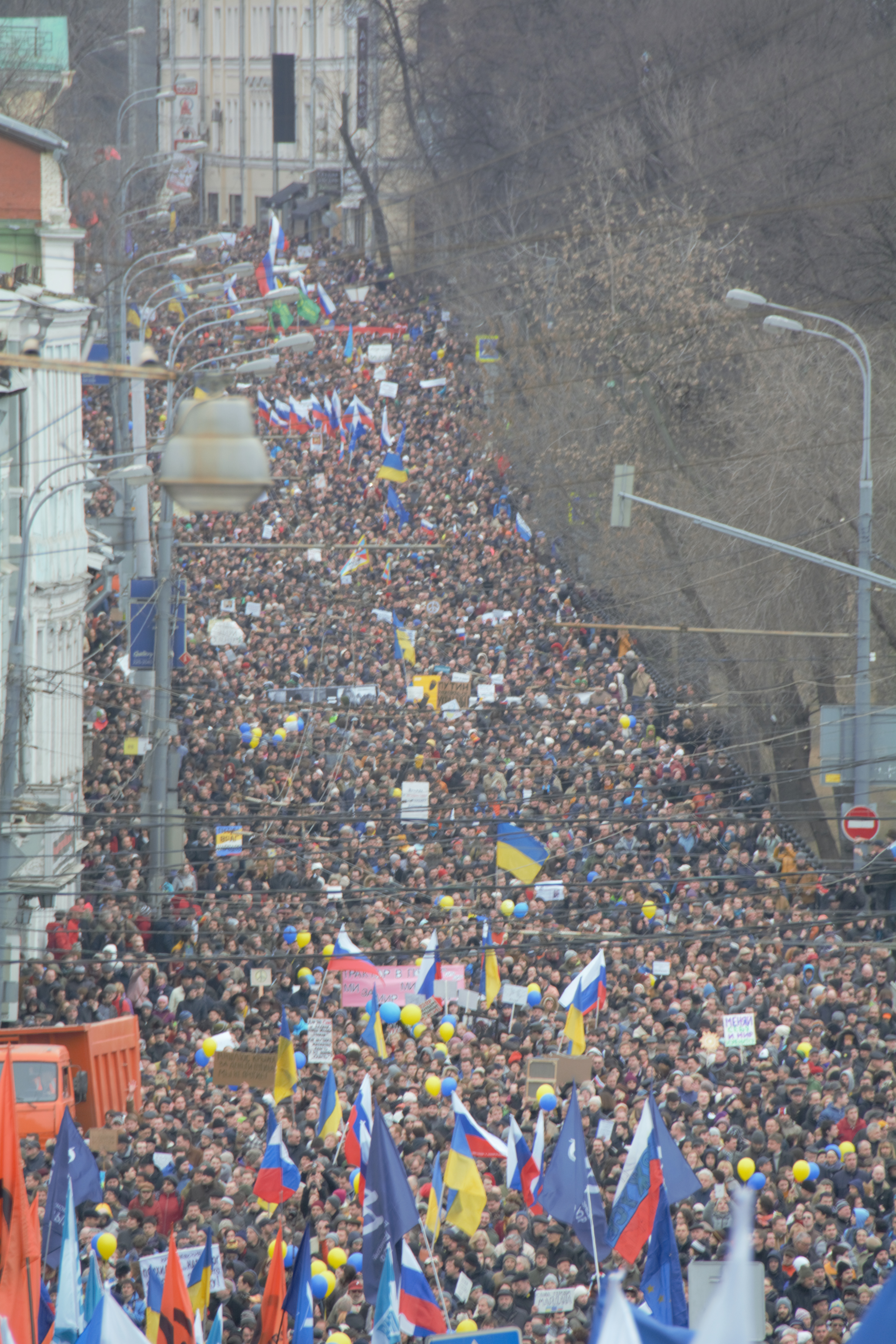
- At least 30,000 people with Russian and Ukrainian flags, flags of political parties and peace symbols
- Date: 2 & 15 March, 21 September 2014
- Location: Mostly in Moscow and Saint Petersburg, Russia
- Caused by: Opposition to the Russo-Ukrainian War; Opposition to the authority of Vladimir Putin; Opposition to the pro-government demonstrations; Solidarity with the Euromaidan protesters
- Goals: Military withdrawal of Russia from Ukraine
- Methods: Demonstrations; Internet activism

Parties
(Russia) Russian opposition: Solidarnost; Yabloko; Civic Platform; Republican Party of Russia – People's Freedom Party; 5th of December Party; Progress Party; Democratic Choice; Right Cause; Autonomous Action; Russian Socialist Movement; Democratic Union; Western Choice; Alliance of Greens and Social Democrats; Anti-war activists; Anti-censorship activists	Government of Russia; Ministry of Internal Affairs; Police; Internal Troops; OMON; SOBR; United Russia; Supported by: Communist Party; A Just Russia; Liberal Democratic Party; Essence of Time; Civic Platform

Lead figures
(Russia) Boris Nemtsov (Russia) Alexei Navalny (Russia) Ilya Yashin (Russia) Andrey Makarevich (Russia) Vladimir Milov (Russia) Irina Prokhorova (Russia) Gennady Gudkov (Russia) Dmitry Gudkov (Russia) Valeriya Novodvorskaya (Russia) Konstantin Borovoi	Vladimir Putin (Russia) Dmitry Medvedev (Russia) Sergey Kurginyan; Vladimir Zhirinovsky

Number
Ministry of Defence, 2 March: 130; Manezhnaya Square, 2 March: 230; Moscow, 15 March: 30,000 (Reuters), 100,000 (Russian opposition), 3,000 (Moscow police)	

The 2014 anti-war protests in Russia refers to a series of anti-war demonstrations opposing the Russian military intervention in Ukraine that took place in Russia in 2014. Protesters held two anti-war protest rallies on 2 and 15 March 2014. The latter, known as the March of Peace (Russian: Марш Мира, Marsh Mira), took place in Moscow a day before the Crimean referendum. The protests have been the largest in Russia since the 2011–2013 Russian protests by the Russian opposition against the alleged electoral fraud committed by United Russia during the 2011 Russian legislative election. Reuters reported that around 20,000 people participated in the 15 March demonstrations.

== Timeline ==
On 1 March, five people who were picketing next to the Federation Council building against the invasion of Ukraine were arrested. The next day about 200 people protested at the building of the Russian Ministry of Defense in Moscow against Russian military involvement. About 500 people also gathered to protest on the Manezhnaya Square in Moscow and the same number of people on the Saint Isaac's Square in Saint Petersburg. On 2 March, about eleven protesters demonstrated in Yekaterinburg against Russian involvement, with some wrapped in the Ukrainian flag. On 15 March, for a rally in support of Ukraine in Yekaterinburg, according to various sources, between 400 and 600 people left, including the Mayor of the city Yevgeny Roizman. Protests were also held in Chelyabinsk on the same day. The opposition to the military intervention was also expressed by rock musician Andrey Makarevich, who wrote in particular: "You want war with Ukraine? It will not be the way it was with Abkhazia: the folks on the Maidan have been hardened and know what they are fighting for – for their country, their independence. [...] We have to live with them. Still neighborly. And preferably in friendship. But it's up to them how they want to live". The Professor of the Department of Philosophy at the Moscow State Institute of International Relations Andrey Zubov was fired for his article in Vedomosti, criticizing Russian military intervention.

On 2 March, one Moscow resident protested against Russian intervention by holding "Stop the war" banner, but he was immediately harassed by passers-by and when the police was arresting him, a woman offered to fabricate a serious charge (beating up a child) against him; however, the proposal was rejected by the police. Andrei Zubov, a professor at the Moscow State Institute of International Relations, who compared Russian actions in Crimea to the Anschluss of Austria, was threatened. Alexandr Chuyev, the leader of the pro-Kremlin Spravedlivaya Rossiya party, also objected to Russian intervention in Ukraine. Boris Akunin, popular Russian writer, predicted that Russia's moves would lead to political and economic isolation.

Protests against the Russian intervention also occurred outside Russian embassies in London, Berlin, Vilnius and Ankara on 2 March.

=== March of Peace (15 March) protests ===
Protests against the Russian intervention in Crimea also took place in Cologne and outside the Russian Consulate in Bonn, Germany, on 15 March.

In August, about a dozen activists were arrested outside the Ukrainian Embassy in Moscow for protesting against Russian president Vladimir Putin.

=== 21 September ===
Another anti-war rally with about 5,000 to 20,000 demonstrators took place on Pushkinskaya Square in Moscow on 21 September 2014. The Washington Post reported that "tens of thousands" protested the war in Ukraine with a peace march in downtown Moscow "under heavy police supervision". There were minor scuffles with pro-Russian supporters, but no serious violence or arrests were reported. About a thousand people also gathered outside the Kazan Cathedral in Saint Petersburg to protest against Russia's involvement in Ukraine.

Thousands of people around the world supported this event by holding anti-war demonstrations on the same day. In the US, San Francisco, New York, Washington, DC, Los Angeles, Seattle, Houston and Boston took part in the protest activities.

== Anti-war congress ==
On 19 March 2014, the anti-war congress of Russian intelligentsia took place in Moscow. The memorandum issued by the Congress proclaims:

We, the representatives of the Russian intelligentsia feel ourselves obliged to warn the authorities from making historical mistake – the desire to take control of a part of Ukraine, the country which was considered as a brotherly one.

== Open letter by Russian scientists ==
On 19 March 2014, a group of Russian scientists published an open letter to the Russian Ministry of Communications. The letter demanded the Ministry to check the television programs of Dmitry Kiselev for signs of extremism and incitement of ethnic hatred.

== Gallery ==
Anti-war demonstrations on 15 March 2014. Sight from the inside.

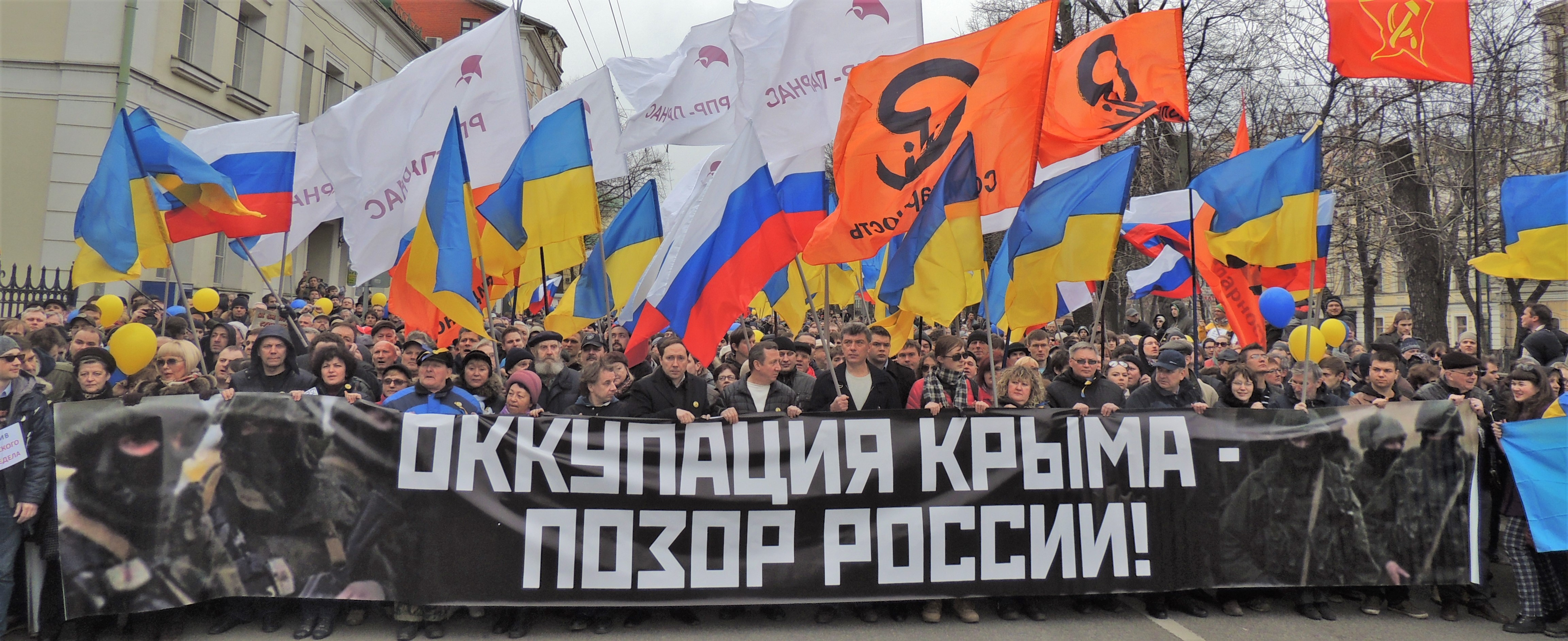
Protesters holding a banner saying: occupation of the Crimea is a shame of Russia

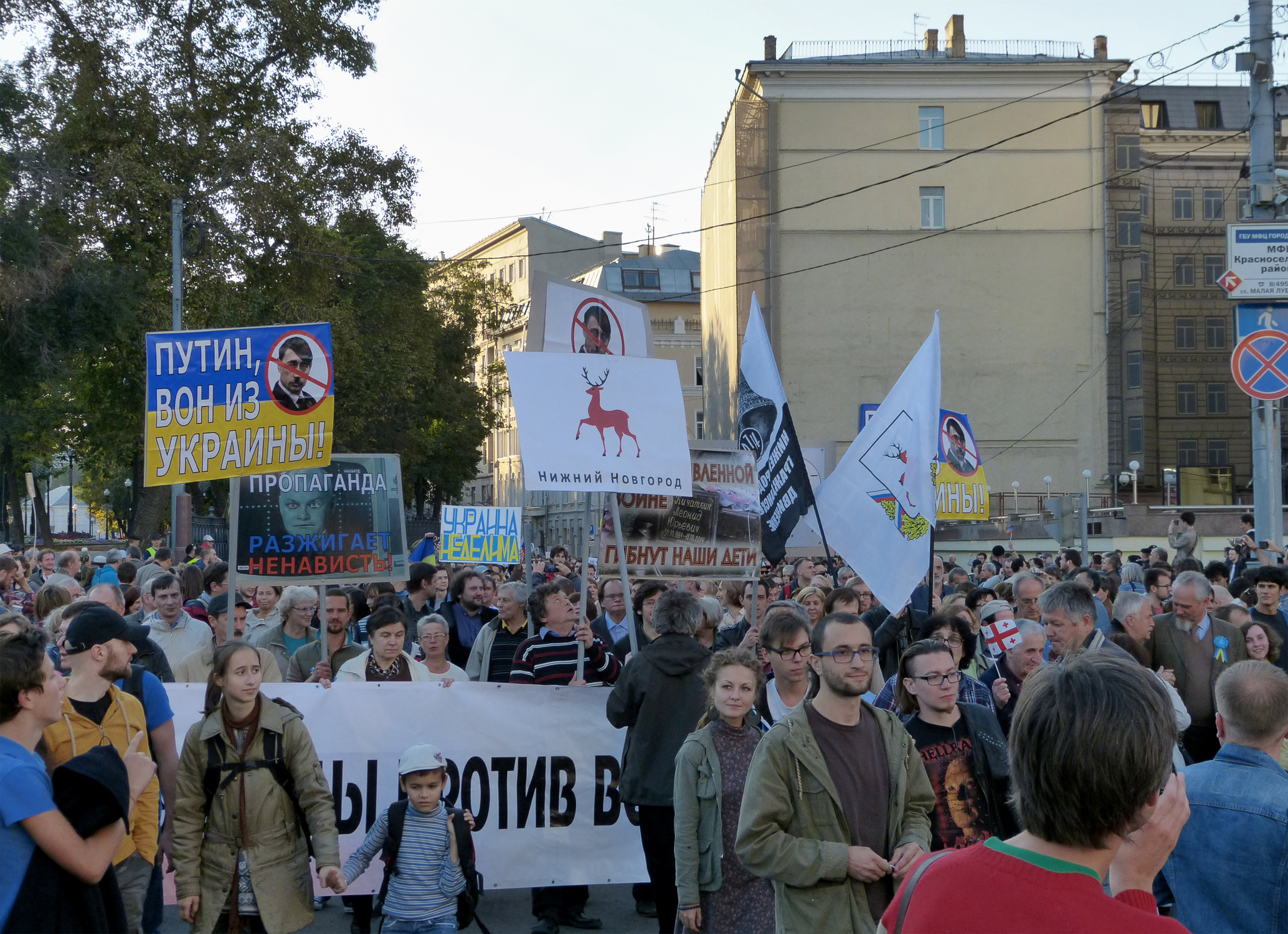
Protest in Moscow, 21 September 2014

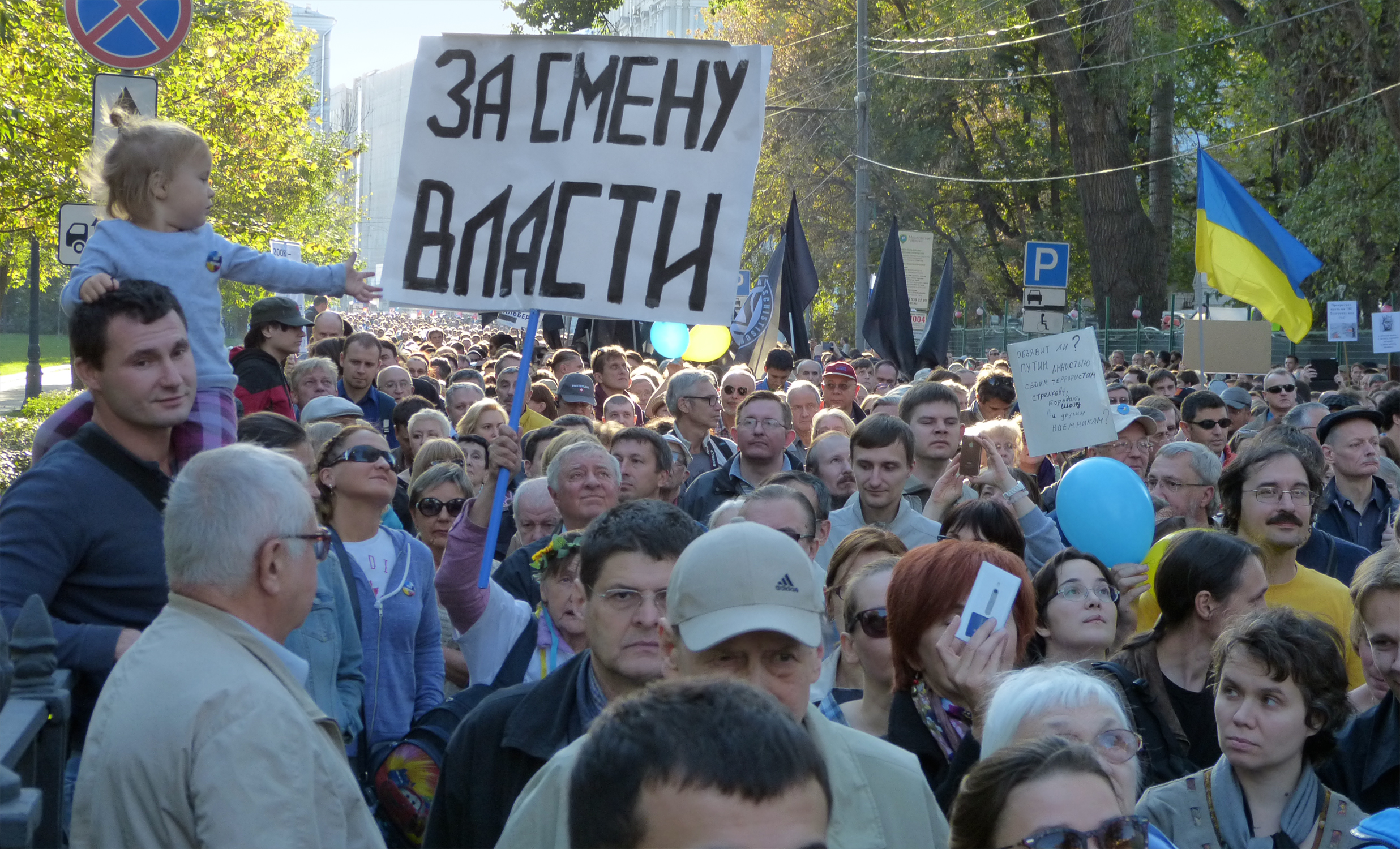
Protest in Moscow, 21 September 2014

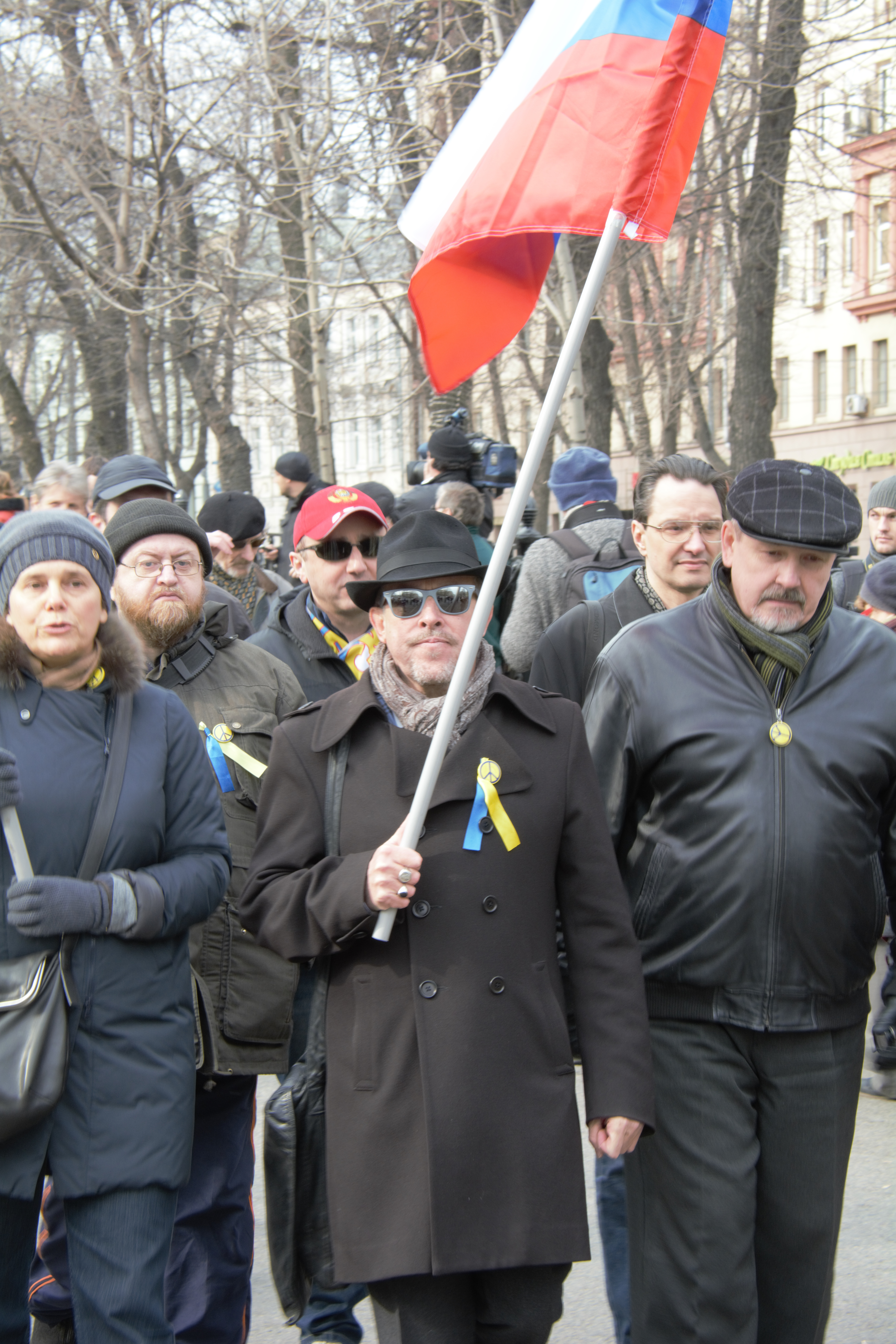
Irina Prokhorova with Andrey Makarevich

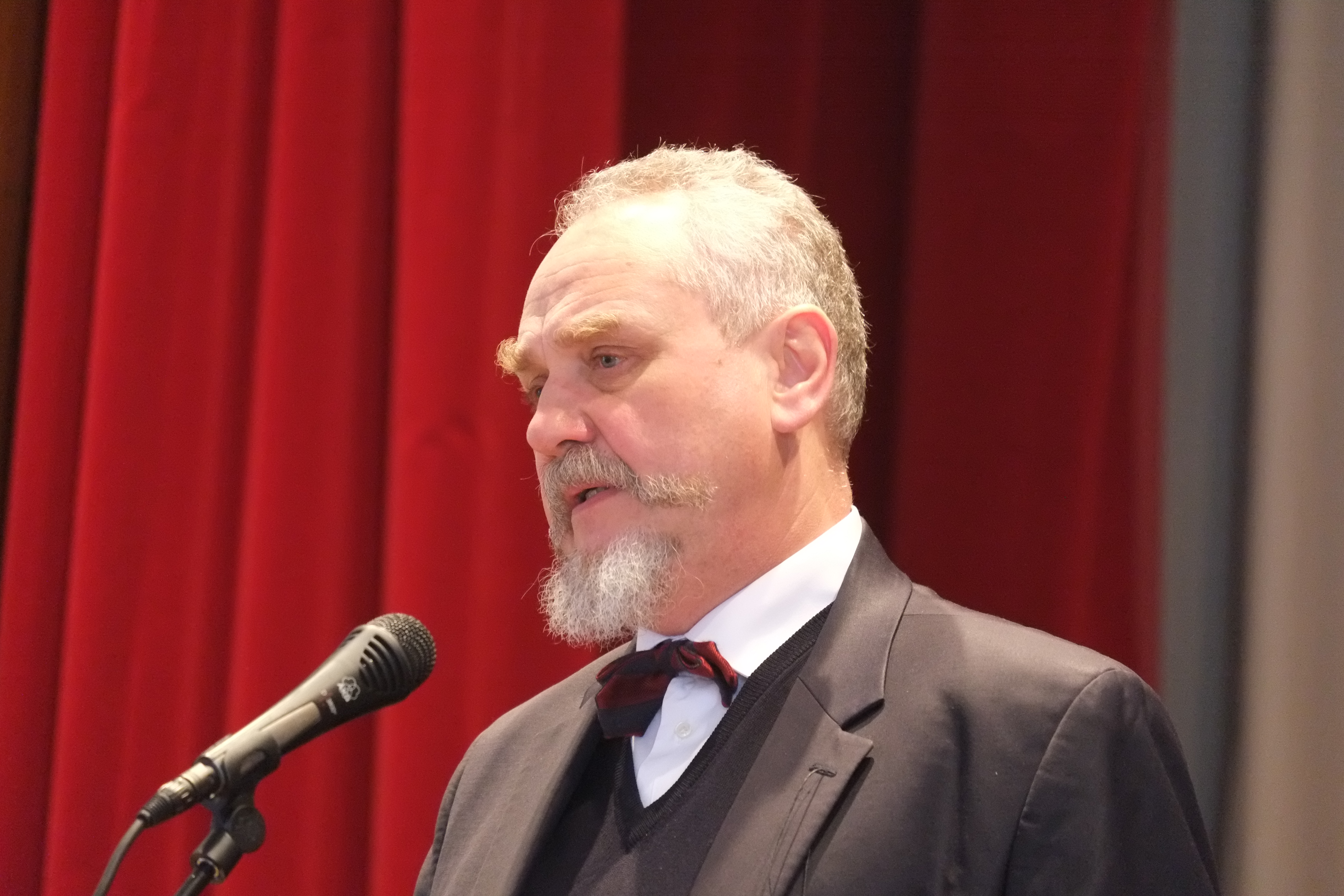
Professor Andrey Zubov speaking at the anti-war congress in Moscow

== See also ==
- Bibliography of Vladimir Putin
- Bibliography of Russian history (1991–present)
- Reaction of Russian intelligentsia to the 2014 annexation of Crimea
- List of protests in the 21st century
- 2022 anti-war protests in Russia
- State Duma initiative for charging Vladimir Putin of high treason
