= Andrei Shutov (academician) =

Russian historian (born 1963)

- Андрей Шутов
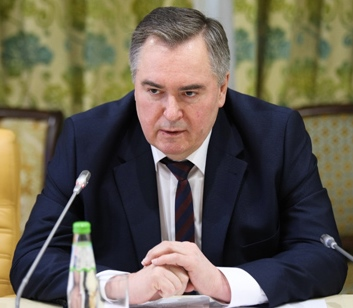
- Shutov in 2018
- Born: 9 March 1963 (age 63); Moscow, Soviet Union
- Citizenship: Russia
- Education: Moscow State University
- Scientific career
- Fields: Political science, history
- Workplaces: MSU Political Science Faculty
- Academic advisors: Olga Mityayeva

Andrei Yuryevich Shutov (Russian: Андрей Юрьевич Шутов; born March 9, 1963 in Moscow) is a Russian political figure and historian. He has been a member of the Central Election Commission of Russia since March 19, 2021. He is a Corresponding Member of the Russian Academy of Sciences since 2022.

He is a Doctor of Historical Sciences, Professor, and Dean of the Faculty of Political Science at Lomonosov Moscow State University and Head of the Department of History and Political Theory. He is also Chairman of the Political Science Council of the Educational and Methodological Association for Classical University Education of the Russian Federation, Co-Chair of the All-Russian Public Organization "Russian Society of Political Scientists," and Chairman of the Expert Council of the Higher Attestation Commission of Russia for political science. He is the author of over 120 academic publications on Russian history and political science (history of local government and civil society institutions in Russia).

== Biography ==
He graduated from the Philosophy Department at Moscow State University in 1986 and completed his postgraduate studies there in 1988. In 1993, he defended his PhD dissertation, "The Political Process (Theoretical and Methodological Aspects)." From 1989, he worked as an assistant, and from 1991, as a senior lecturer and associate professor in the Political Science Department of the Philosophy Department at Moscow State University (Department of the Political Process of Russia). In 1999, he defended his doctoral dissertation, "The Zemstvo Electoral Process in Russia (1864-1917)."

In 2001, with the reorganization of the Political Science Department, he became head of the newly created Department of Public Policy at Moscow State University. From 2000 to 2008, he headed the Public Relations Department of the Philosophy Department at Moscow State University and oversaw the educational program "Political Management and Public Relations".

In 2008, by order of Moscow State University Rector Viktor Sadovnichiy, he was appointed Acting Dean of the Faculty of Political Science at Moscow State University. On November 12, 2012, he was confirmed in this position for a five-year term by the University's Academic Council. He has also served as Chairman of the Expert Council of the Higher Attestation Commission of Russia in Political science (since 2013).

In April 2017, Shutov was nominated to the Civic Chamber of the Russian Federation by the Presidium of the Russian Society of Political Scientists and the St. Andrew the First-Called Foundation, an international public foundation for promoting the spiritual and moral revival of modern society. In May 2017, he was elected a member of the Civic Chamber of the Russian Federation. His areas of expertise include public diplomacy, support for compatriots abroad, strengthening traditional values, and patriotic education.

In 2017, Andrei Shutov was elected Chairman of the Board of Directors of the Expert Institute for Social Research (EISR). According to Kommersant and Vedomosti newspapers, the Expert Institute for Social Research will prepare a report on the "image of Russia's future", which Vladimir Putin could use in the 2018 Russian presidential election.

On December 18, 2018, Andrei Shutov became an honorary professor at Kalmyk State University. On March 19, 2021, by decree of the President of Russia, he was appointed a member of the Central Election Commission of Russia.

== Sanctions ==
Since December 9, 2022, for supporting Russian aggression against Ukraine and holding "referendums" in the occupied territories of Ukraine, he has been subject to US sanctions as a member of the Russian Central Election Commission, which held referendums "that were replete with cases of obvious coercion and intimidation of voters". For similar reasons, he is subject to sanctions by Ukraine, Australia, and New Zealand. On December 18, 2023, he was included in the sanctions list of EU countries because he "was responsible for organizing illegal referendums in 2022 and illegal elections in September 2023 in the occupied territories of Ukraine, thereby attempting to legitimize Russian aggression in these territories".

On December 18, 2023, he was sanctioned by the European Union as being responsible for "organising illegal referendums in 2022 and illegal elections in September 2023 in the occupied territories of Ukraine, thus attempting to legitimise Russia’s war of aggression in these territories".

== Publications ==
With the establishment of the Faculty of Political Science, he continued his research in the history of political studies and the teaching of political science at Moscow University and throughout Russia. He has prepared and published over 50 scholarly works, including:

- "Russian Zemstvos and European Traditions of Local Self-Government" (Moscow, 2011);
- "Karl Heinrich Langer. On the Limits and Most Important Representatives of Political Science" (Moscow, 2011 — general editor);
- "Selected Works of Professors of the Moral and Political Department of Moscow University (1804-1835)" (Moscow, 2010 — as part of a group of authors);
- "Essays on the History of Political Science at Moscow University" (Moscow, 2009), and others.

He is Editor-in-Chief of the journal "Bulletin of Moscow University. Series 12. Political Sciences".

He is a member of the dissertation councils in political science at Moscow State University.

His research interests are political theory, history of political science, local government, electoral systems and electoral process, political analysis and forecasting.
