= Municipal initiative for charging Vladimir Putin of high treason =

Prosecution attempts of the Russian president

The Municipal initiative for charging Vladimir Putin of high treason is an initiative from council deputies of the Smolninskoye Municipal Okrug in Saint Petersburg on 7 September 2022 to call on the State Duma to charge president Vladimir Putin with treason. The next day, the seven deputies who supported this initiative were called to the police, and this council was dissolved by court order a few days later. A day after this initiative, another initiative from Lomonosovsky District in Moscow also expressed discontent towards Putin and called on him to resign.

== Background ==
On 24 February 2022, Russia invades Ukraine, which analysts assessed had an original goal to capture the capital Kyiv in three days. However, this goal did not materialize and Russia's war efforts began to stall, as Russian forces eventually withdrew from the war effort in Northern Ukraine around the capital of Kyiv.

Then on 6 September 2022, the Ukrainian military began the 2022 Kharkiv counteroffensive, laying bare vulnerabilities in the Russian war effort and led to mounting anger within Russia about the war.

== Municipal initiative ==
On 7 September 2022, council members of the Smolninskoye Municipal Okrug in Saint Petersburg passed an initiative criticizing Putin and his role in the "special military operation". The document called on members of the State Duma to charge Putin with treason and force his dismissal under Article 93 of the Constitution of Russia, which allows the Duma to dismiss the president based on charges of treason or other serious crimes.

According to MP Dmytro Palyuga, one of the signatories of the initiative, Putin is harming the security of the Russian Federation and "we want to show people that there are deputies who do not agree with the current course and believe that Putin is harming Russia. We want to show people that we are not afraid to talk about it". Later, in a conversation with The Insider, Palyuga specified that 7 out of 10 members of the Smolninskoye Council voted in favor of the initiative.

=== Main provisions ===
The text of the appeal was published on 7 September, 2022 by Dmytro Palyuga on Twitter, and included four main points:

1. The "special military operation" led to the continual destruction of combat units of the Russian Armed Forces, causing many young able-bodied citizens to either become disabled or die.
2. The Russian economy is suffering. The difficulty of replacing foreign components, the withdrawal of foreign companies from the Russian market, along with the emigration of educated Russians, will all make a mark on the economic well-being of Russian citizens.
3. NATO is expanding. The Russian president (Putin) has claimed that NATO expansion threatens Russia's national security. Yet as a result of the president's actions, Sweden and Finland both joined the alliance, doubling the length of the Russia–NATO border.
4. Demilitarization is a stated goal of the "special military operation". But the resulting consequences have been the exact opposite due to military aid to Ukraine amounting to $38 billion, which is more than the total annual defense spending of Canada or Poland.

The initiative concludes with the following: "In this regard, we ask you as deputies of the State Duma to come up with a proposal to bring charges of treason against the President of the Russian Federation in order to dismiss him from office".

== Aftermath ==
On 9 September 2022, two days after the publication of the initiative, the seven deputies in Smolninskoye Municipal Council that voted in favor of the initiative were summoned to the police office. According to the Ministry of Internal Affairs, the deputies were accused of violating Law No. 32-FZ by "discrediting the current government". In addition, five deputies also received fines amounting to ₽ 44-47 thousand rubles. Then, on 13 September, the Smolninsky District Court of St. Petersburg recognized that the municipal council did not hold meetings, and dissolved the council on this basis.

=== Similar initiative from Moscow ===
On September 8, 2022, a day after the initiative from St. Petersburg, the Council of Deputies of the Lomonosov Municipal District in Moscow also submitted a similar initiative calling on Putin to resign from the post of presidency. According to the initiative, "studies show that in countries with regular changes of power, people live better and longer on average than in those where the leader leaves office only with his feet forward (Note: Meaning a leader that only considers his/her own interests and not those of the general public)". As such, the text concludes with the following: "In connection with the above, we ask you to resign from office due to the fact that your views and your management model are hopelessly outdated, and is hindering the development of Russia and its human potential".

== See also ==
- 2014 anti-war protests in Russia
- 2022 anti-war protests in Russia
