= Andrey Zubov =

Russian historian (born 1952)

Andrey Borisovich Zubov
- Андрей Борисович Зубов
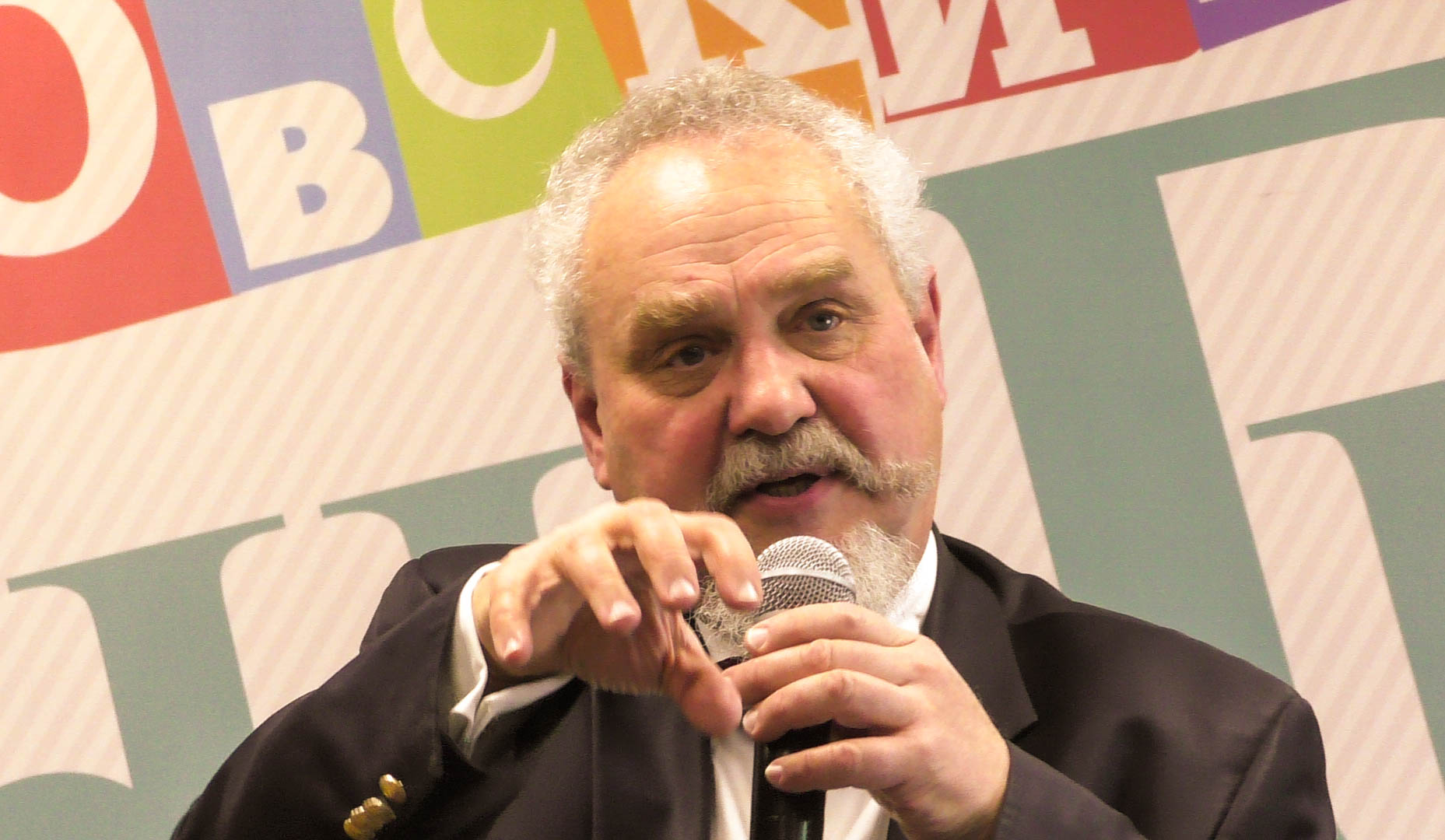
- Zubov in 2017
- Born: January 16, 1952 (age 74); Moscow, RSFSR, Soviet Union
- Education: Moscow State Institute of International Relations
- Spouse: Olga Zubova
- Awards: Order of St. Sergius of Radonezh; Order of Holy Prince Daniel of Moscow; "Znamia" Literary Magazine Award
- Scientific career
- Fields: History, Oriental studies, religious studies, political science
- Workplaces: Institute of Oriental Studies of the USSR Academy of Sciences; Moscow State Institute of International Relations; Russian Orthodox University; Masaryk University
- Thesis: Парламентская демократия и политическая традиция Востока (1989)

Andrey Borisovich Zubov (Russian: Андре́й Бори́сович Зу́бов, born 16 January 1952, Moscow) is a Russian historian, religion scholar and political scientist, Doctor of History, prominent public person, church figure, political activist and commentator. He was also the Vice-president of the former People's Freedom Party.

Zubov is a former Professor of the Moscow State Institute of International Relations (MGIMO). He temporarily lost his job after making a comparison of the deployment of Russian troops in Crimea with Hitler's annexation of Austria in the Russian newspaper Vedomosti. One month later he was reinstated to his position until his contract at the MGIMO officially expired.

== Biography ==
Andrey Zubov was born on January 16, 1952, in Moscow. He Graduated from Moscow School No. 56 in 1968. In the same year, he entered the Moscow State Institute of International Relations (Department of International Relations).

Upon his graduation in 1973, he started working at the Institute of Oriental Studies of the Russian Academy of Sciences.

In 1978, he defended his candidate’s thesis on ‘Experience of parliamentary democracy research in Thailand’.

In 1989, he defended his doctoral thesis in history on ‘Parliamentary democracy and political tradition of the East’.

Between 1988 and 1994, he taught history of religions at the Moscow Theological Academy, where he was appointed associate professor in 1990.

From 1994 to 2012, he was Head of the Department of Religion Studies at the Faculty of Philosophy and Theology of the Russian Orthodox University.

In 2001, he resigned from the Institute of Oriental Studies of the Russian Academy of Sciences and moved to MGIMO where he became professor at the Department of Philosophy and also headed the University Center on ‘Church and International Relations’.

In March 2014, Andrey Zubov was fired following his criticism of the actions of the Russian government in Ukraine and Crimea (for ‘committing an act of indecency’, as the official order read). However, the Presidential Commission to Protect Labour Rights declared the dismissal illegal and he was reinstated to his position on 11 April 2014 and continued to work until the formal expiration of his contract on June 30, 2014.

In 2009–2014, he was a member of the Synodal Biblical-Theological Commission of the Russian Orthodox Church and a member of its Inter-Council Presence. He is one of the authors of the ‘Basic Social Concept of the Russian Orthodox Church’ (2000).

In 2014–2018, he was a columnist at Novaya Gazeta.

Starting from 2014, he has been giving public lectures at various venues and on the Internet on history of philosophy, history of religious ideas, and on the Russian history.

He has edited three volumes of "Russian History: 20th Century."

He is one of leading members of People's Freedom Party. He ran for Duma in 2016 and came in the third place in the Moscow Center constituency.

In 2022, he moved to Czech Republic, working in Masaryk University.

In February 2023, Zubov was listed by Russian government as a "foreign agent".

Professor Zubov speaks English, Thai and French.

== Academic career and publications ==
Initially, Andrey Zubov focused himself on the political history of Thailand and Asian parliamentary systems. Under the influence of the famous Russian indianist, Vsevolod Sementsov and his wife, Olga Zubova (Egyptologist) he became interested in comparative religious studies.

Since 1993, he has been lecturing and writing books on the history of religious ideas. He taught the history of religious ideas at Moscow Theological Academy (1988–1994), Russian Orthodox University (1994–2011), MGIMO (2001–2014), Russian State University for the Humanities (1994–1998), etc.

In 2006, he became the editor-in-chief of a multivolume book on Russian history, ’History of Russia. XX century.’ The writing team united more than 45 contributors from Russia, Russian diaspora, European and American specialists in Russian studies (Vittorio Strada, Richard Pipes). The project was originally developed under the leadership of Aleksandr Solzhenitsyn, who read and edited most of the manuscript (approximately until 1956), but in autumn 2007. Solzhenitsyn chose to take distance from it (the reasons are revealed in his letter to Zubov, a copy of which is available in the blog russia_xx) The book was published in two volumes in 2009 (volume 1: Introductory chapter and 1894–1939 period, volume 2: 1939-2007 period). In 2016-17 a new three-volume edition came out (volume 1: Introductory Chapter and 1894–1922 period; Volume 2: 1923-1953 period; Volume 3: 1953-2008 period).

The book was translated in Czech and published in two volumes in Prague.

Since his expulsion from the MGIMO, Professor Zubov has made frequent appearances in opposition media, expressing himself among other issues on historical matters.

In 2014, A.B.Zubov was awarded the title of Honorary Doctor of the Kyiv-Mohyla Academy (Ukraine), in 2019 he became an Honorary Doctor of Masaryk University (Brno, Czech Republic).

== Social, political and church activities ==
Andrey Zubov is a practicing Orthodox Christian.

He is a member of the editorial board of the Kontinent journal. In 1998 he was awarded the Znamya Foundation Prize.

On July 16, 2005, by the decision of the Holy Synod of the Russian Orthodox Church, he was included in the working group for the development of ‘a conceptual document on the position of the Russian Orthodox Church in inter-religious relations’.

He has been a member of the National Alliance of Russian Solidarists (NTS) since 2003.

Andrey Zubov was awarded the orders of Holy Prince Daniel of Moscow (III degree) and St. Sergius of Radonezh (III degree) in 2006 and 2008 personally by Patriarch Alexy II.

On June 29, 2009, by the decision of the Patriarch of Moscow and all Rus' Kirill, Professor Zubov was included in the editorial board for writing a textbook for the course ‘Basics of Orthodox Christian Culture’ for high school.

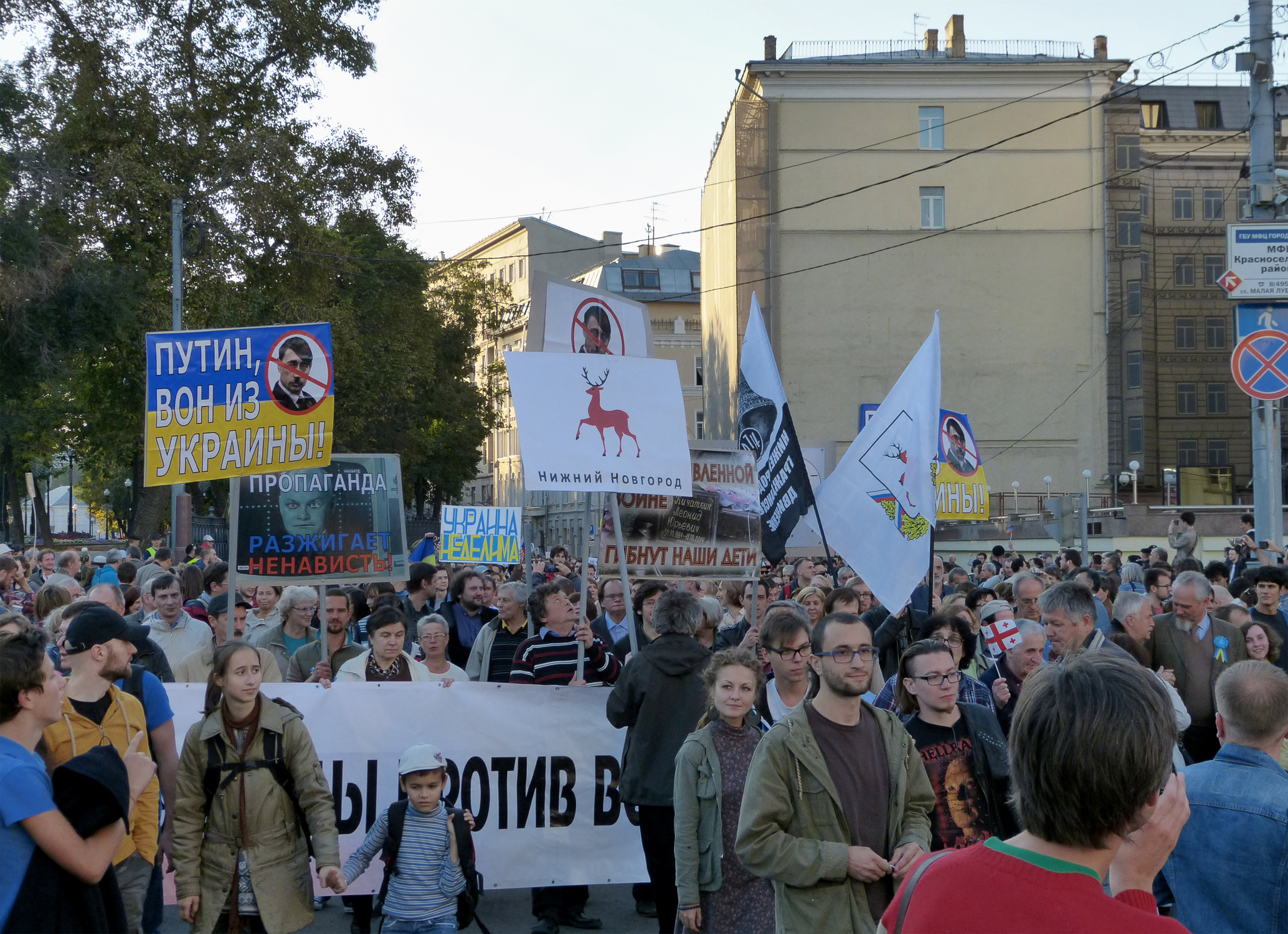
Zubov at anti-war protest in Moscow on 21 September 2014

On September 29, 2009, he took part in the conference ‘Religion and Political Culture’ organized in Rome by the Pontifical Gregorian University and the Konrad Adenauer Foundation. He made a report on the relationship between the Church and the Russian State in the 20th century.

In March 2012, he publicly expressed his opposition to Pussy Riot trial: in his opinion, the punishment was disproportionate, and even in the Russian Empire sentences in similar cases were less severe.

In the spring of 2014, he criticized Russia’s actions in Crimea, comparing it to the Anschluss. In September that year, he was one of the signatories to a declaration that stated that a political regime of "fascist type" was fast taking shape in Russia and called on the authorities ‘to put an end to the aggressive adventure: to withdraw Russian troops from Ukraine and to stop propaganda as well as material and military support to the separatists in southeastern Ukraine’.

In spring 2016, Andrey Zubov announced that he would take part in the State Duma elections as a member of the People’s Freedom Party. He came in the third place in his constituency.

In February 2022, he condemned the Russian invasion of Ukraine. Shortly before the invasion, Zubov said: "In Russia we have no possibility to influence our government or our parliament. But I signed [anti-war petition] so that I could express my opinion and distance myself from Russia's ruling elite, which is breaking international law."

== Works ==
Professor Zubov has published eight major books and more than 300 articles.

=== Books ===
- Парламентаризм в Таиланде: опыт исследования современного восточного общества методом анализа избирательной статистики (Parliamentary System in Thailand: a Study of a Contemporary Asian Society by Analysing Electoral Statistics), Moscow, 1982.
- Парламентская демократия и политическая традиция Востока (Parliamentary Democracy and Asian Political Tradition), Moscow, 1990.
- L’Euroasia del Nord : Il rischio del caos dopo l’impero sovetico / Ed.San Paolo. Turin — Milano, 1994.
- Обращение к русскому национальному правопорядку как нравственная задача и политическая цель (Return to the Russian National System of Justice as a Moral Task and a Political Goal), Moscow, 1997.
- A.B. Zubov (1997). История религий. Книга первая: Доисторические и вне-исторические религии. Курс лекций. (History of Religions. Volume One: Prehistoric and Ahistoric Religions. Series of Lectures). Moscow: Planeta Detey. ISBN 5-86065-034-5.
- A.B. Zubov, ed. (2009). История России. XX век: 1894-1939. (History of Russia. XX Century: 1894-1939). Vol. 1 (5000 экз ed.). Moscow: AST. ISBN 978-5-17-059362-0.
- A.B. Zubov, ed. (2009). История России. XX век: 1939-2007. (History of Russia. XX Century: 1939-2007. Vol. 2 (5000 экз ed.). Moscow: AST. ISBN 978-5-17-059363-7.
- A. Zubov; V. Buldakov; L. Gudkov; Yu. Pivovarov; Yu. Ryzhov; Ph. Boobbyer; L. Luks; G. Nivat; R. Pipes; V. Strada (2011). Россия на рубеже веков. 1991-2011 (Russia at the turn of the century. 1991-2011). Moscow: Rosspen. ISBN 978-5-8243-1598-1.
- A.B. Zubov (2016). Лекции по истории религии (Lectures on History of Religion (2000 экз ed.). Moscow: Alpina Non-fiction. ISBN 978-5-91671-602-3.
- A.B. Zubov, ed. (2017). История России XX век. Как Россия шла к ХХ веку. От начала царствования Николая II до конца Гражданской войны (1894-1922). (History of Russia. XX Century. Russia's Journey into the XX Century from the beginning of Nicolay II Reign to the End of the Civil War (1894-1922)). Vol. 1 (3000 экз ed.). Moscow: Eksmo. ISBN 978-5-699-89930-2.
- A.B. Zubov, ed. (2017). История России XX век. Эпоха Сталинизма (1923-1953). History of Russia. XX Century. Stalin's Epoch (1923-1953)). Vol. 2. Moscow: Eksmo. ISBN 978-5-699-92087-7.
- A.B. Zubov, ed. (2017). История России ХХ век. Деградация тоталитарного государства и движение к новой России (1953 — 2008). (History of Russia. XX Century. Degradation of a Totalitarian State and Movement towards a New Russia (1953 — 2008)). Vol. 3. Moscow: Eksmo. ISBN 978-5-699-93347-1.
- A.B. Zubov co-authored by O.I. Zubova (2018). Религия Древнего Египта. Часть 1. Земля и боги (Religion of the Ancient Egypt. Part 1. Land and Gods). Moscow: RIPOL Classic. ISBN 978-5-386-09668-7.
- .A.B. Zubov (2023). Russian Catastrophe and the Chances to Overcome It. Brno: Masaryk University Press. ISBN 978-80-280-0384-5.

== Family ==
- Wife: Olga Igorevna Zubova, born 1948, historian, Egyptologist. Married since 1982.
- Father: Boris Nikolayevich Zubov (1912–2007), Russian shipbuilder, admiral.
- Mother: Ia Evgeniyevna Zubova (Savostyanova) (1916–2005). Associate Professor of the Department of General Chemical Technology, candidate of Technical Sciences.
- Brother: Sergey Borisovich Zubov, born in 1944.
- Children: Xenia, Irina, Daria, Daniil.
