= Spas (TV channel) =

Spas Телеканал «Спас»
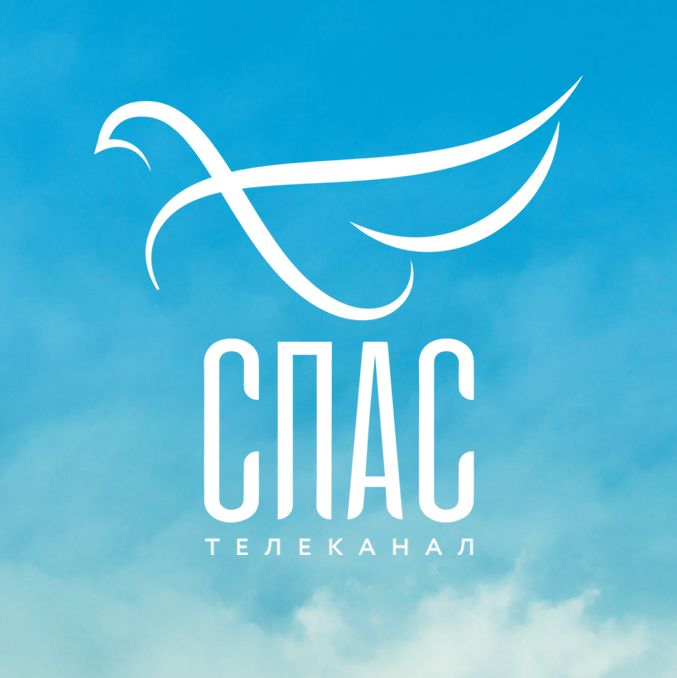
- Country: Russia
- Broadcast area: Belarus, Kazakhstan, Russia, Ukraine
- Headquarters: Moscow, Russia

Programming
- Picture format: 576i 16:9

Ownership
- Owner: Spas TV

History
- Launched: 28 July 2005

Links
- Website: www.spastv.ru

Availability

Terrestrial
- Russian-wide broadcast: -

Spas (Russian: Телеканал «Спас») is a federal channel in Russia which is associated with the Russian Orthodox Church. It started broadcasting in on 28 July 2005. The main owner of the channel is the Moscow Patriarchate of the Russian Orthodox Church. The founders of the TV channel are Alexander Batanov (died 2009) and Ivan Demidov.

== Overview ==
The mission of the channel is a formation of moral philosophy and a system of coordinates needed for effective development of the state, based on the old aged Orthodox values, development and strengthening of spiritual and moral foundations of the Russian state.

Its main activities are:

1. Information - coverage of the Russian Orthodox Church, Moscow Patriarchate, and the Patriarch of Moscow and all Rus' with reflection of the Russian Orthodox Church to the events of political, economic and cultural life of Russia.
2. Education - spiritual and moral education and religious education of the Russian people, especially children and youth enabling them to gain knowledge of God, Orthodoxy and Orthodox culture.
3. Catechesis - promoting Russian Orthodox Church in matters of catechesis, or in other words, teaching people in the faith.

Program policy: 60% percent of the airtime is devoted as a public broadcasting channel with documentaries and educational and training programs. 40% of the airtime is devoted to Orthodox subjects. A significant number of programs are produced in their own studio named Poliformatnoy, including Live Shows. This constitutes the basis of either the studio's own production and spiritual orientation for the 18 + audience, as well as documentaries.

== Broadcasting ==
As a result of the competition held in Roskomnadzor on 25 September 2013, it has the right to broadcast as part of the second digital television multiplex in Russia.

=== Digital terrestrial TV ===
On 23 October 2013 at 15:00 Moscow Time, Russian Television and Radio Broadcasting Network (RTRS, the national transmission network) began broadcasting the channel in digital television in the second multiplex RTRS-2 in the standard DVB-T2. The first digital broadcast "Saviour" was published as a cultural and educational program for children and youth.

=== IPTV ===
The channel is part of the interactive IPTV Rostelecom.

=== Cable TV ===
The channel broadcasts on multiple cable television operators in Russia and CIS.

=== Satellite broadcasting ===
Broadcasting is carried by the satellite Yamal200 number 1 90°E. The signal covers almost the entire territory of the Russian Federation, the Commonwealth of Independent States, Baltic states, Eastern Europe, a number of Western European countries, as well as Central and Southeast Asia.

Broadcasting is also performed with the platforms NTV Plus (in the "West Light" package) and Tricolor TV (in the "Super-Optimum" package) via satellite Eutelsat W4,36°E.

== Near closure in 2010 ==
On 30 June 2010, it was announced that Spas would shut down due to financial problems, but channel staff denied such information. They also reported that "Spas' financial situation does not cause concern":

Yes, Spas TV JSC has cut some contracts, but all contracts are being renewed. The Spas channel does not have pending debts with its staff.

Да, действительно ООО «Спас ТВ» расторгло часть договоров с контрагентами, но в настоящее время все договора возобновляются и пролонгируются. У телеканала «СПАС» нет задолженности ни перед контрагентами, ни перед сотрудниками.

According to Olga Lyubimova:

"The main problem of the Spas channel was that it entered a crisis, and before the crisis the amount of sponsors that we found were frivolous, quickly abandoned the channel and a team was hired. A classic 90s mistake, which for some reason happened in the 2000s.

== Blocks and sanctions ==
On 16 March 2022, YouTube blocked the channel. The channel announced its transition to Rutube where all of its archives would migrate.

The channel was sanctioned in December 2023 by the EU, on the grounds of disseminating pro-Kremlin propaganda and misinformation on the war in Ukraine through "spiritual and religious arguments".
