= MSU Faculty of Political Science =

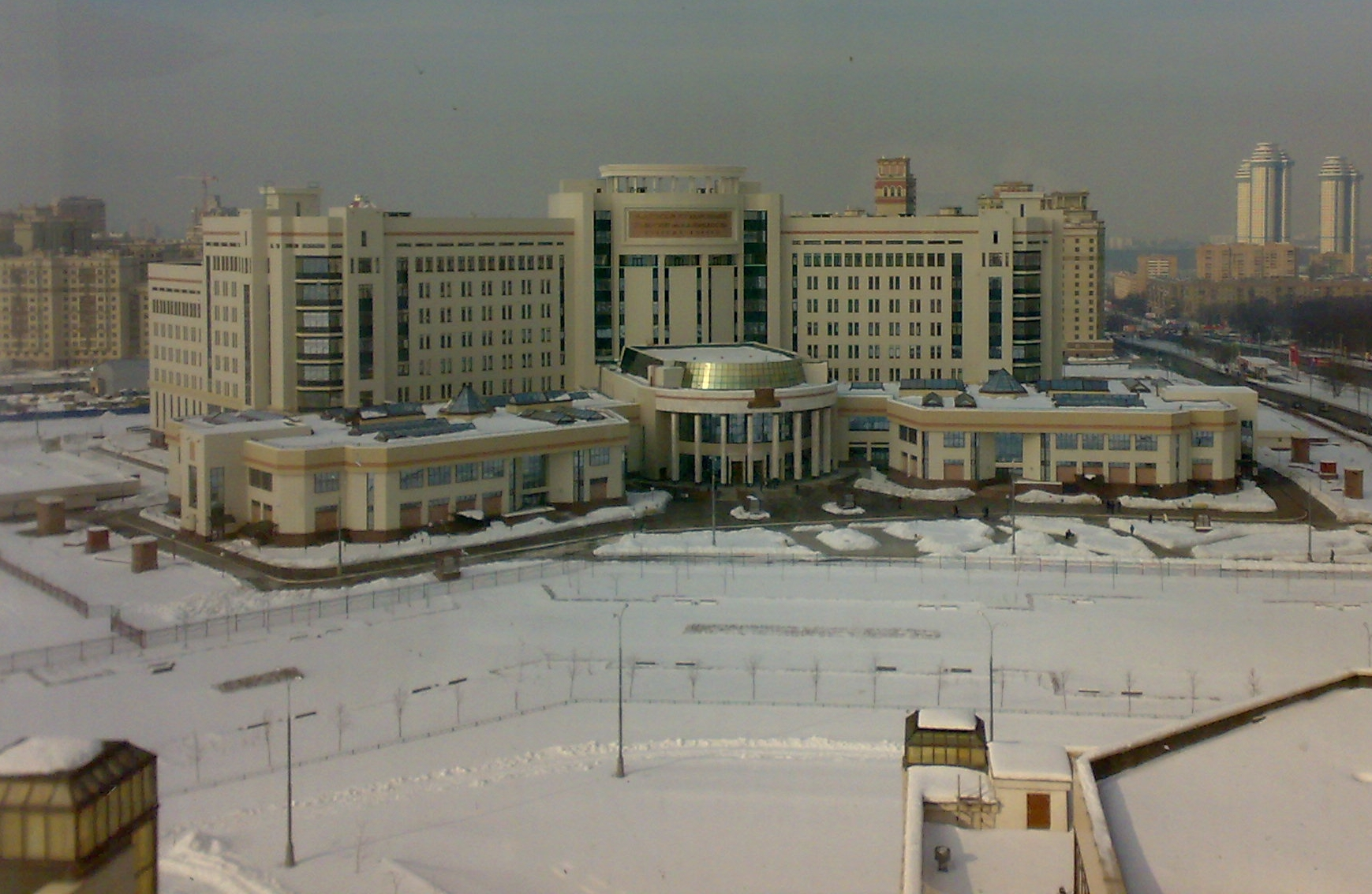
- Faculty building
- Type: Public
- Established: 1934
- Dean: Andrei Shutov
- Location: Shuvalovsky Korpus, Moscow, Russia; 55°42′00″N 37°31′46″E
- Campus: Urban
- Affiliations: MSU
- Website: polit.msu.ru

The Faculty of Political Science of Moscow State University (Russian: Факультет политологии МГУ) is a scientific and educational structural division of Moscow State University, which trains students in the speciality of political science and conflict studies, as well as trains highly qualified scientific and pedagogical personnel in political science through graduate and doctoral studies.

== History ==
Plans to establish a Faculty of Political Science at Moscow State University became known in the summer of 2008. The faculty was created from the political science departments of the Philosophy Faculty, which had decided to separate into a new division. The United Russia party intended to play an active role in the faculty's work. According to several media reports, chairman of the State Duma, Boris Gryzlov was slated to be brought in to manage the faculty. The rector of Moscow State University, Viktor Sadovnichy later denied this information, stating: "The esteemed Boris Vyacheslavovich will have no connection with the faculty's management. He and other politicians will be able to give lectures".

The decision to establish the faculty was made by the Academic Council of Moscow State University on August 29, 2008. Professor Andrei Shutov, former head of the Department of Public Policy at the Faculty of Philosophy, was appointed Dean of the faculty. According to him, the faculty continues the tradition of teaching political science at Moscow University, established by Mikhail Lomonosov in 1755 with the establishment of the Department of Politics. In its first year, the faculty enrolled approximately 120 students. In the fall of 2008, the Faculty of Political Science addressed organizational issues: refining department structures and developing educational programs. In 2011, the faculty launched a program for training political leaders.

In the summer of 2013, the faculty's first graduating class graduated. Ninety-two graduates received diplomas.

In March 2025, the course "Introduction to Western Studies: Political Aspect" by philosopher, professor, and doctor of sociological and political sciences Alexander Dugin was launched.

== Structure ==
Currently, research and educational work at the Faculty of Political Science at Moscow State University is conducted in seven departments:

- Department of History and Theory of Politics
- Department of the History of Socio-Political Doctrines (until 2008, a department of the Faculty of Philosophy; until 1990, the History of Socialist Doctrines
- Department of Russian Politics
- Department of Sociology and Psychology of Politics
- Department of Comparative Political Science
- Department of Public Policy
- Department of International Relations and Integration Processes

The Faculty of Political Science houses five laboratories, which serve as a mechanism for engaging young scholars from among undergraduate and graduate students in fundamental and applied research and the development of scientific and practical recommendations.

- Laboratory of Mathematical Methods of Political Analysis and Forecasting
- Laboratory of Communication Systems and Information Technologies
- Laboratory of Applied Political Research
- Laboratory of Political and Legal Research
- Laboratory of Historical and Political Culture

The faculty includes departments of graduate and doctoral studies, continuing education, and international relations.
