= Interfax =

Russian news agency

- Native name: Интерфакс
- Type: Private limited company
- Industry: News media
- Founded: September 1989
- Headquarters: 1st Tverskaya-Yamskaya str. 2, Moscow, Russia
- Area served: Worldwide
- Key people: Mikhail Komissar (chairman and CEO); Vladimir Gerasimov (executive director; Interfax Group. general director)
- Products: Wire service
- Owner: Senior management
- Number of employees: Over 1,000
- Website: interfax.com

Interfax (Russian: Интерфакс) is a Russian news agency. The agency is owned by Interfax News Agency joint-stock company and is headquartered in Moscow.

== History ==
As the first non-governmental channel of political and economic information about the USSR, Interfax was formed in September 1989, during Mikhail Gorbachev's perestroika and glasnost period, by Mikhail Komissar and his colleagues from international broadcasting station 'Radio Moscow', a part of Soviet Gosteleradio system. Interfax originally used fax machines for text transmission, hence the company name.

By 1990, Interfax had 100 subscribers and the agency quickly began to attract the attention of conservatives within the government, who attempted to shut down the agency. This saw the agency gain prominence in major western media, a position strengthened by its coverage of the 1991 August Putsch and the collapse of the Soviet Union.

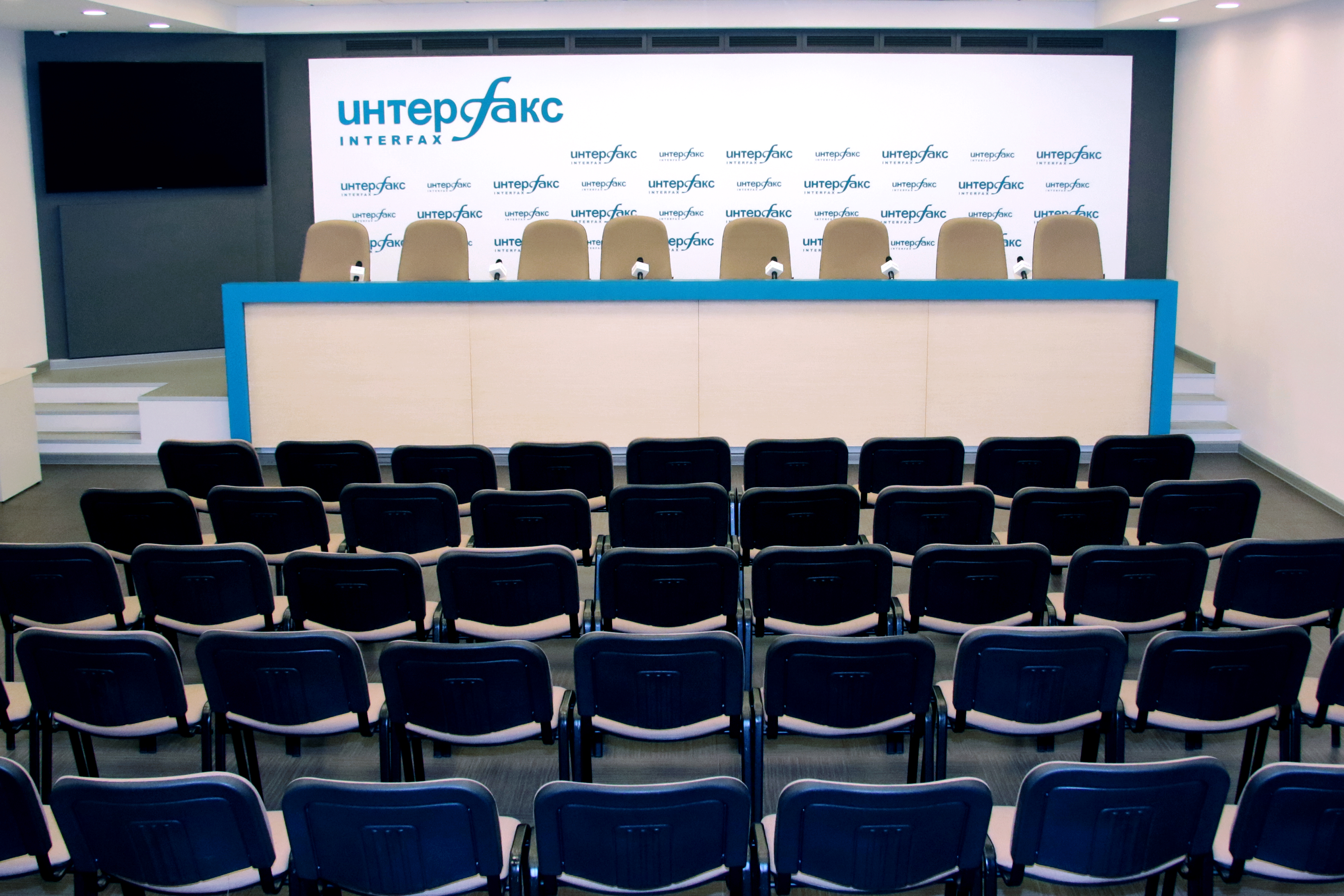
Interfax Press Center in Moscow (2016)

Interfax continued to expand in the 1990s, adding subsidiary agencies for financial, metallurgical, oil and gas markets, information products on agriculture, business law, transport, telecommunications, and the market data terminal 'EFiR information system' for stock market players to its general news coverage. Interfax also opened subsidiaries across the post-Soviet states, first in Ukraine (1992), Belarus (1993) and Kazakhstan (1996), and later in Azerbaijan (2002), during this time bringing the number of local offices across the regions of Russian Federation to 50.

To promote its information products abroad, Interfax opened its first company outside the former USSR in 1991, when 'Interfax America' was opened in Denver, CO. This was followed by the opening of London-based 'Interfax Europe Ltd.' (1992), 'Interfax Germany GmbH', based in Frankfurt (1993), and the 'Interfax News Service Ltd.' in Hong Kong (1998).

In 2004, Interfax created the 'SPARK system' designed to check business agents in Russia, Ukraine and Kazakhstan, Interfax also launched media monitoring services through its 'SCAN system'. In 2011, the company added London-based project, 'Interfax Global Energy', which reports on the energy markets worldwide.

== Partnerships ==
In 1999, Interfax launched a rating agency in partnership with Moody's Investors Service to provide rating services on the Russian market. SPARK system became the basis for a joint venture with Dun & Bradstreet, a provider of business credit information and credit reports. Also in 1999, Interfax and Reuters signed a cooperation agreement.

Since 2001, Interfax has collaborated with Business Wire, which distributes corporate regulatory disclosures and press releases. Interfax also offers consumer credit reports via a joint venture with Experian and Sberbank of Russia.

== Management ==
'Interfax Group' senior management includes Mikhail Komissar as chairman of the board and CEO, Vladimir Gerasimov, executive director and general director of financial and business information service, Georgy Gulia, executive director of general information service.

== Analysis and bias ==
Interfax provides general and political news, business credit information, industry analysis, market data and business solutions for risk, compliance and credit management. The company employs over 1,000 staff in over 70 bureaus worldwide and publishes over 3,000 stories each day.

== Dissemination ==
Interfax controls around 50% of the Russian corporate data market. Subscription-based business and financial intelligence contribute to the bulk of the revenues generated by Interfax with IT-analytical business solutions accounting for approximately 75% of revenue.

Interfax's holding company comprises more than 30 news producing and marketing companies in Russia, Kazakhstan, Belarus, Azerbaijan, the United Kingdom, the United States, Germany and China.

== Awards ==
In 2015, Interfax was awarded the Runet Prize in the category "Culture, Media and Mass Communications" by the Russian Federal Agency for Press and Mass Media.

In 2016, Interfax was awarded the Runet Prize in the category "Economy, Business and Investment".

== Literature ==
- Boyd-Barrett O. Interfax: Breaking Into Global News. — Scotforth Books, 2014. — p. 184. — ISBN 978-1909817135
- Shrivastava K. News Agencies: From Pigeon to Internet. — Sterling Publishers Private Limited, 2007. — p. 208. — ISBN 978-1-932705-67-6
- Герасимов В., Ромов Р., Новиков А., Бондаренко С., Бабиченко С. Технология новостей от Интерфакса / Под ред. Ю. Погорелого. — Moscow: Аспект Пресс, 2011. — 160 с. — ISBN 978-5-7567-0608-6 (in Russian)
