= Russian Orthodox University =

- Российский православный университет
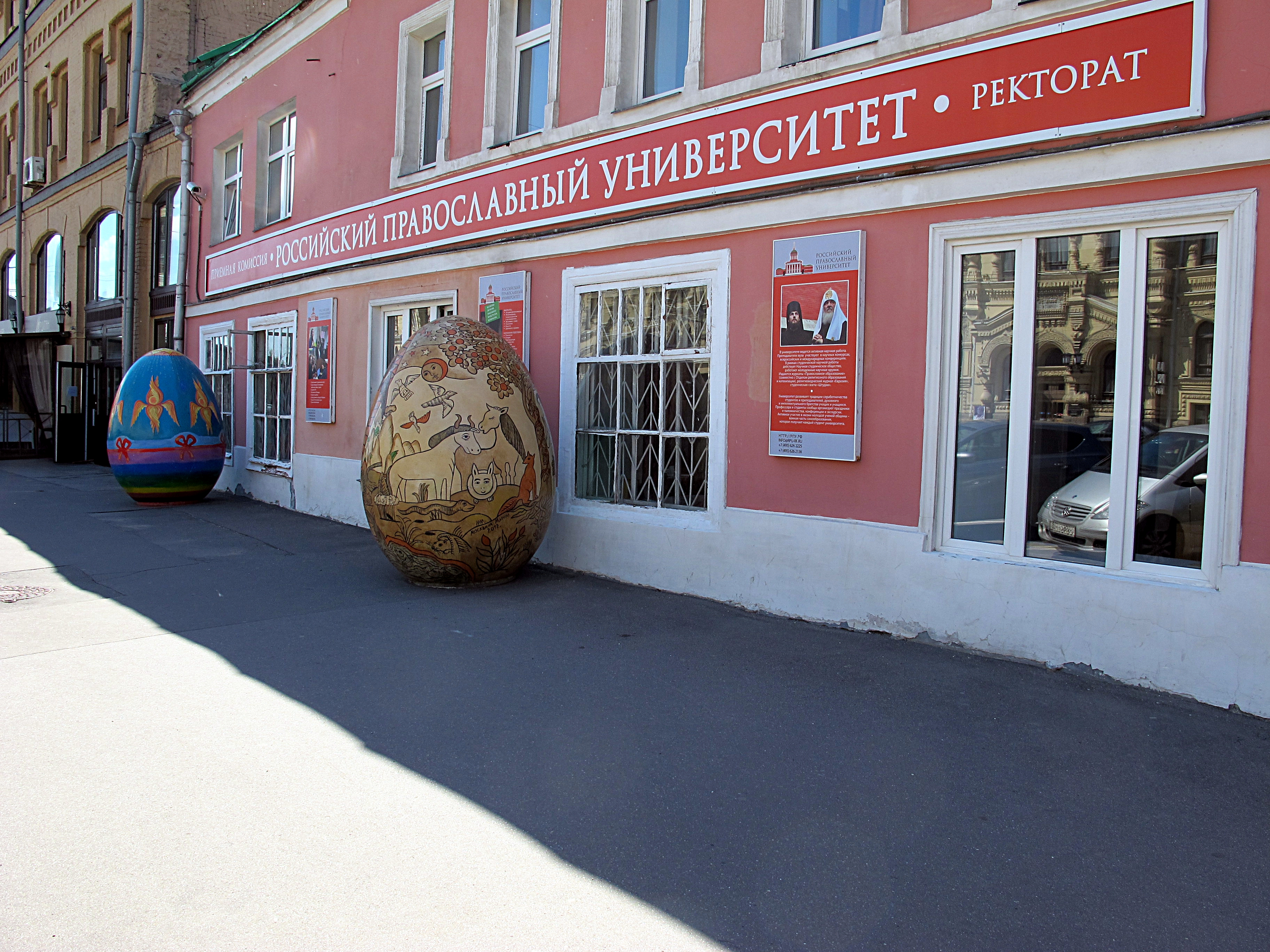
- Administration building of Russian Orthodox University
- Established: 2011
- Location: Chernyshevskogo 11A, Moscow, Russia; 55.7577°N 37.6278°E
- Website: rpu-rf.ru

Russian Orthodox University of Saint John the Theologian (ROU; Russian: Российский православный университет святого Иоанна Богослова) is an institution of higher religious education of the Russian Orthodox Church, reestablished in 2011 in accordance with the decree of Patriarch of Moscow and all Rus' Kirill I of Moscow at the base of Russian Orthodox Institute of St. John the Divine which were founded in 1992 by the Patriarch of Moscow and all Rus' Alexy II of Moscow. Rector of the university — Hegumen Peter (Yeremeev). University has a state educational license and accreditation.

The university was located on the territory of the temple complex in the name of St. John the Evangelist at the Elm - patriarchal Metochion in Kitay-gorod (on New Square), Moscow. Nowadays RPU is located in Chernyshevsky lane.

== Structure ==
Faculties

- Faculty of Philosophy and Theology
- Faculty of Humanities
- Faculty of Psychology
- Faculty of Church Ministry
- Department of Philology and Journalism

== Assessments ==
Russian religious scholar and historian of philosophy Kontantin M. Antonov think, that along with the Moscow Theological Academy, ROU is "leading church universities".
