= Georgy Rogozin =

Russian KGB and FSB agent

- Георгий Георгиевич Рогозин
- senior officer of the FSB Georgy Rogozin (after 1994)
- Born: 7 August 1942; Vladivostok
- Died: 6 March 2014 (aged 71)
- Other name: "Merlin the Kremlin" or "Nostradamus in uniform"
- Citizenship: Soviet Union; Russia
- Education: higher
- Alma mater: High school "Red Flag"
- Occupations: jurisprudence, parapsychology
- Organization: secret service
- Known for: "Merlin the Kremlin" or "Nostradamus in uniform"
- Title: Major general KGB, Federal Security Service (Russia)
- Political party: non-party

Georgy Georgievich Rogozin (Russian: Георгий Георгиевич Рогозин; 7 August 1942 – 6 March 2014) was a KGB and later FSB officer who retired with the rank of major general.

== Biography ==
Rogozin was born 7 August 1942 in Vladivostok of the RSFSR. After graduation in civil engineering, he worked as motor mechanic ("Vostokrybholodflot"). From 1962–1965 served in the Soviet Army, and in 1969 graduated from High school "Red Flag" of the KGB at the 1st Department (counterintelligence profession – military counterintelligence).

Until 1972, Rogozin served as operations officer aboard the hydrographic service of the Pacific Fleet. From 1972–1975 he studied at the graduate Higher School of the KGB, 1st special department (the basis of counter-intelligence activities), and received his doctorate of jurisprudence. He then taught at the Higher School of the KGB, the third special department (military counterintelligence). From 1978–1980 he was first a senior representative and then a senior research fellow operative-analytical service of third Directorate of the KGB (military counterintelligence). From 1980–1983 he was a senior research fellow and later deputy head of a laboratory at the Institute of the KGB, Major (who worked in a departmental research institutes "Forecast" for the development of the protection of state secrets and state secrets).

In 1983–1985, Rogozin was senior security officer information department in Primorsky Krai Directorate of the KGB in Vladivostok (in the form of walking Captain 2nd rank). Then in 1985 he became the senior operations officer of the Office "A" (analytical) 2nd Department of the KGB (the total counter-intelligence – a work with foreign residency, diplomatic and commercial offices in the USSR). In 1986 he became Assistant Division Chief in the same 2nd Chief Directorate, Lieutenant Colonel and became deputy head of that department in 1987. In 1988–1992, Rogozin worked at the Institute for Security (KGB Research) as a scientific consultant of the 1st Division. Engaged in research, field work in the structure of the KGB, he worked in the presidential structure.

In 1992 he worked in the Security Service of the President as First Deputy Chief of Presidential Security. He worked on telepathy, clairvoyance, hypnosis, applied psychology, parapsychology, telekinesis, astrology etc. In state research institutes, in private laboratories Rogozin conducted secret experiments trying to get extrasensory perception between intelligence services, the CIA and the KGB. In 1994 he became a Major-General of the FSB of Russia.

Rogozin, while serving under Alexander Korzhakov, a former KGB general who served as head of the presidential security service from 1993 to 1996, dealt in occult and parapsychological activities. Rogozin claimed to raise the souls of the dead, penetrate people's subconscious through photographs, and made up horoscopes for Boris Yeltsin. The retired Russian general Boris Ratnikov reported that his boss Rogozin would lie down and fall into a hypnotic state. He claimed to use a photograph to penetrate Madeleine Albright's subconscious, and reported that she was thinking about stripping Russia of Siberia and the Far East.

== Publications ==
- Г. Г. Рогозин, Б. К. Ратников (Boris Ratnikov), Д. Н. Фонарев, «За гранью познанного», изд. «ВеГа» (НАСТ России), 2008 г. ISBN 978-5-903649-02-0 (УДК 004—027.21 ББК 32.81 P25); ("Abroad the knowledge") (in Russian)
- Г. Г. Рогозин, Б. К. Ратников (Boris Ratnikov), Д. Н. Фонарев, «За гранью познанного», изд. «Академия управления», серия «Хроники реального мира», г. Москва, 2010 г. ISBN 978-5-91047-012-9; ("Abroad the knowledge", series "Chronicles of the real world") (in Russian)
- Г. Г. Рогозин, Б. К. Ратников (Boris Ratnikov), "Картина мира в представлении спецслужб", ISBN 978-5-91047-019-8 (Painting the world in the representation of special services) (in Russian)

=== Documentary films with his participation ===
- "Зов бездны"("The Call of the Abyss"); (in Russian)
- "Штурм сознания" Громкое дело ("Storm of consciousness" High-profile case). (in Russian)
