= Crucified boy =

2014 Russian atrocity propaganda story in Ukraine

"Crucified boy" (Russian: Распятый мальчик, romanized: Raspyaty malchik) is a reference to an anti-Ukrainian fake news story spread, among others, by Russian state-owned Channel One on July 12, 2014.

The story was first published by Eurasianist philosopher Aleksandr Dugin on 9 July 2014. It was then republished in news reports, officially titled "A refugee from Sloviansk recalls how a young son and a wife of a militiaman were executed in front of her". It contained allegations of a public crucifixion of a three-year-old boy performed by Ukrainian soldiers at "Lenin Square" in Sloviansk, as told by an alleged resident of Sloviansk, Halyna Pyshnyak (Ukrainian: Галина Пишняк, Russian: Галина Пышняк), a native of Zakarpattya. The story has become a staple example of Russian fake news.

The spread of the story served to distract from the Donetsk People's Republic's withdrawal from Sloviansk, and the cross-border shelling of Ukraine by Russian armed forces.

== History ==
Investigative journalists from the Russian news outlets Novaya Gazeta and TV Rain who visited Sloviansk did not find any supporting evidence to back up the allegations, nor did they find any audio or video footage of the incident which was unusual as actions of the Ukrainian army in the city were well documented at the time. BBC News pointed out that there is no "Lenin Square" in Sloviansk, although there is an "October Revolution Square". An investigation of Pyshnyak determined that her husband was a former Berkut unit member who had joined the separatist unit led by Igor Strelkov.

The incident was later widely used as an example of disinformation or fake news that "became the standard" for modern Russian mass media. In Russian mass culture, the episode – this "good piece of propaganda" – became "synonymous for journalist fakes." The spread of the news about the "crucified boy" was later used for statistical analysis of the expansion of fake information in modern social networks and search engines.

Galina Timchenko, the former editor of Russian news portal "Lenta.ru", said that it was a gross breach of professional ethics by the leading Russian television channels. Russian opposition leader Alexei Navalny called Channel One Russia "nuts" for airing the report. Another Russian opposition politician, Boris Nemtsov, stated that it was an attempt to rally naïve people behind the idea of a war against Ukraine. Russia Today, which was widely reporting the story on their TV channel and online with headline "Kiev army now literally crucify babies in towns, forces mothers to watch", later deleted the story from their website and denied any previous involvement; however, most copies of their coverage on social media remained in place.

The story was officially retracted by Channel One, which was the first to air it, on 21 December 2014, saying they had merely relayed a purported eyewitness report.

When Elena Racheva asked Russians returning from the Luhansk People's Republic in 2015 why they had gone to the Donbas, some volunteers explicitly cited the crucifixion story. In 2021 Russian journalist Masha Borzunova found Pyshnyak who was living in Russia and admitted she "regrets" fabricating the story.

A similar story was distributed in April 2021 when Russian media widely reported that a Ukrainian UAV killed a boy in Oleksandrivsk village. Investigative journalists determined that the child had actually died as a result of the explosion of a land mine stored unsafely in a village resident's garage. The UAV narrative was invented by the press service of the Donetsk People's Republic.

== See also ==
- Media portrayal of the Russo-Ukrainian War
- Propaganda in Russia
- "The Crucified Soldier", a World War I fabricated story
