= Andrei Viktorovich Malgin =

Soviet and Russian journalist

Andrei Malgin
- Андрей Виĸторович Мальгин
- Born: 20 April 1958; Sevastopol, Ukrainian SSR, Soviet Union
- Citizenship: Russia
- Occupations: Journalist, literary critic, publisher, blogger

Andrey Viktorovich Malgin (Russian: Андрей Виĸторович Мальгин; born April 20, 1958, USSR, Sevastopol) is a Soviet and Russian journalist, literary critic, publisher, blogger, and entrepreneur.

== Biography ==
Malgin was born into a family of a naval officer. When he was one month old, his family relocated to the Moscow region due to his father's military service. During his high school years, Malgin started contributing to Komsomolskaya Pravda, particularly in the "Scarlet Sails" section, which was then under the leadership of Yuri Shchekochikhin. Malgin credits Shchekochikhin as his first journalism mentor.

In 1975, Malgin enrolled in the International Department of the Faculty of Journalism at Moscow State University. In 1977, he was selected to study at the University of Warsaw as an exchange student. While in Poland, Malgin wrote articles about contemporary music for the Rovesnik and Student Meridian magazines. Upon his return, he regained his position at Moscow State University but he was banned from traveling abroad for eight years.

In 1982, Malgin graduated from Moscow State University and joined Literaturnaya Gazeta. There, he regularly published articles and book reviews about contemporary authors. He especially highlighted young poets, including Alexei Parshchikov, Ivan Zhdanov, Alexander Eryomenko, Marina Kudimova, Oleg Khlebnikov, and Viktor Korkia, and organized literary events featuring their work. One of these poetry events, featuring musicians Boris Grebenshchikov and Sergey Kuryokhin, was abruptly canceled, leading to a spontaneous protest near the KGB building on Lubyanka. Following this incident, Malgin was dismissed from Literaturnaya Gazeta. Between 1986 and 1990, he headed the literature and art department at the Nedelya newspaper, where he actively published previously banned authors. Notably, Sergei Dovlatov had his work published there for the first time after emigrating to the United States. After Dovlatov's death, Malgin published an obituary in the Moscow News newspaper.

With the onset of Perestroika, Malgin started writing books. He authored two booklets – "Poetry of Labor" (1986) and "Publicism in Poetry (Robert Rozhdestvensky and Yevgeny Yevtushenko)" (1988). He also compiled a collection of interviews with Soviet poets titled "Conversations about the Poem" (1990), which featured discussions with Yevtushenko, Rozhdestvensky, Lev Ozerov, Yegor Isaev, Igor Shklyarevsky, and Andrei Voznesensky. In 1990, Malgin released an expanded essay specifically on the poetry of Robert Rozhdestvensky.

In March 1990, Malgin was elected as a deputy to the Mossoviet in the first democratic elections. That same year, he founded the socio-political magazine Stolitsa and served as its editor-in-chief until May 1996. Subsequently, he ventured into advertising and publishing businesses. He was a co-founder and publisher of the free newspaper Tsentr Plus, owning one-third of its shares.

In February 1991, Malgin authored an article titled "The Most Soviet of Poets" in Stolitsa, which accused the poet Vasily Lebedev-Kumach of plagiarizing the lyrics of the song The Sacred War. Malgin asserted the true author of the song was a diction teacher from Rybinsk named Alexander Bode. The article also alleged Lebedev-Kumach's plagiarism of the foxtrot "At the Samovar." Musicologist and historian Evgeny Levashyov corroborated Malgin's accusations of plagiarism in Lebedev-Kumach's work.

In 2005, Malgin wrote a sharply political and popular novel titled "Counselor to the President." The book became a bestseller and was compared with Dan Brown's The Da Vinci Code by literary critics. The novel was translated into French and Hungarian. The author continued the book's narrative with the play "Prisyadkin in the Other World," which was published in the collection "Putin.doc." The same year, Malgin began his own blog on LiveJournal, at the suggestion of publisher Dmitry Volchek. In 2008, he compiled a separate edition of his blog entries, occasionally including comments from other users. Dmitry Bykov regarded Malgin as one of the finest Russian journalists and editors, and Yulia Latynina praised his LiveJournal blog as one of the best in Russia. Valeriya Novodvorskaya expressed deep respect for Malgin, noting his commitment to upholding principles over the interests of his publication.

In 2008, Malgin sold his business in Russia and moved to Tuscany, Italy.

On September 8, 2023, the Russian Ministry of Justice included Andrei Malgin in its register of foreign agents.

Malgin is also known as the scriptwriter of the television series "The Case of Investigator Nikitin" aired in 2012.

== Personal life ==
Andrey Malgin is married. He and his wife adopted an 11-month-old child named Mitya in early 2009. Malgin also had a daughter, Anastasia, who committed suicide in 2008.
