= Boris Ratnikov =

Russian security official (1944–2020)

- Born: 11 June 1944; Kurovo, Lukhovitsky District, Moscow Oblast, Russian SFSR, Soviet Union
- Died: 6 December 2020 (aged 76)
- Education: Moscow Aviation Institute
- Occupations: Major general KGB, Federal Security Service (Russia)

Boris Konstantinovich Ratnikov (Russian: Бори́с Константи́нович Ра́тников; 11 June 1944 – 6 December 2020) was a retired Major-General of the reserves of Russia's Federal Security Service (Russian: ФСО). He was a key figure in the protection of the President of Russia. He authored a large number of publications and books on the history of domestic intelligence services. He participated in a documentary film "The Call of the Abyss" (Russian: Зов бездны) and "Storm of consciousness" (Russian: Штурм сознания), which aroused wide public interest in Russia.

== Life and career ==
Ratnikov was born on 11 June 1944, in the village of Kurovo, Lukhovitsky District, Moscow Oblast. His father was the director of an agricultural enterprise. In 1969, he graduated from the Moscow Aviation Institute in the specialty department of management systems of aircraft. After his graduation from the institute, Ratnikov worked as an engineer. In 1984, he graduated from the "Red Flag" school for KGB officers with a degree in higher professional education and knowledge of the Persian language.

In the 1980s, Ratnikov went on a business trip to Afghanistan as an adviser of KHAD, took part in the hostilities, awarded orders and medals. He worked in the 4th Service Directorate of the KGB in Moscow and Moscow region. From 1991 to 1994, he was the first Deputy Chief of the General Directorate of guard Russian Federation. In May 1994, he was appointed chief advisor to the President of the Security Service of Russia. From 1996 to 1997, he served as the chief adviser to the Federal Security Service of Russia.

Ratnikov researched telepathy, clairvoyance, hypnosis, applied psychology, parapsychology, telekinesis, astrology, etc. He claimed that the portrayal of parapsychology as a "false" science was created intentionally. Working in state research institutes and private laboratories, he conducted secret experiments for war on extrasensory perception between intelligence services of the CIA and the KGB.

Until 2003, Ratnikov was an adviser to the head of the Moscow Regional Duma. He was later in retirement (Major-General reserves of the Federal Security Service of the Russian Federation). He was a member of the Committee of Commerce and Industry Chamber of Business Security and the head of the Energy-information laboratory (research in the field of parapsychology) of the Academy of the National Association of bodyguards (abbreviation Russian: НАСТ)

In December 2006, Ratnikov told Rossiyskaya Gazeta that his mind-reading work revealed that Madeleine Albright "was indignant that Russia held the world's largest reserves of natural resources." Some Russian officials have presented his claim as a real statement by Albright.

== Publications ==
- Б. К. Ратников (Boris Ratnikov), Г. Г. Рогозин Georgy Ragozin, Д. Н. Фонарев, «За гранью познанного», изд. «ВеГа» (НАСТ России), 2008 г. ISBN 978-5-903649-02-0 (УДК 004—027.21 ББК 32.81 P25); ("Abroad the knowledge") (in Russian)
- Б. К. Ратников (Boris Ratnikov), Г. Г. Рогозин Georgy Ragozin, Д. Н. Фонарев, «За гранью познанного», изд. «Академия управления», серия «Хроники реального мира», г. Москва, 2010 г. ISBN 978-5-91047-012-9; ("Abroad the knowledge", series "Chronicles of the real world") (in Russian)
- Б. К. Ратников (Boris Ratnikov), Г. Г. Рогозин Georgy Ragozin, "Картина мира в представлении спецслужб", ISBN 978-5-91047-019-8 (Painting the world in the representation of special services) (in Russian)
- Б. К. Edwin C. May, Victor Rubel, Joseph W. McMoneagle, Boris Ratnikov, Georgy Ragozin and Loyd Auerbach, "ESP Wars: East & West" ("Пси-войны. Запад и Восток. История в свидетельствах очевидцев"), ISBN 978-1941408797, ISBN 1941408796 (Painting the world in the representation of special services) (in English)
- Б. К. Ратников (Boris Ratnikov), "Родине (стихи)", Альманах «Лубянка», No.5, стр. 125-126; (Historical-journalistic Almanac "Lubyanka" - Motherland, poetry) (in Russian)
- Б. К. Ратников (Boris Ratnikov), "Кто с мечом на Руси появляется, от меча же ему погибать! Сотник стихов", Приложение к журналу «Спецназ». No.1, 1996 г. (Magazine "Special Forces" - "Who will appear in Russia with a sword will die by the sword", centurion of poems) (in Russian)

=== Documentary films with his participation ===
- "Зов бездны" ("The Call of the Abyss") (in Russian)
- "Штурм сознания" Громкое дело ("Storm of consciousness" High-profile case). (in Russian)
