= Alexander Zinoviev =

Russian writer (1922–2006)

- Александр Зиновьев
- Born: 29 October 1922; Pakhtino, Kostroma Governorate, Russian Socialist Federative Soviet Republic
- Died: 10 May 2006 (aged 83); Moscow, Russian Federation
- Awards: Order of the Red Star; Medal "For the Victory over Germany in the Great Patriotic War 1941–1945"; Medal "For the Liberation of Prague"; Medal "For the Capture of Berlin"

Education
- Education: Doctor of Philosophy (1962); Professor
- Alma mater: Moscow State University (1951)

Philosophical work
- School: European philosophy Philosophy of the 20th century
- Main interests: Sociology, Social philosophy, Political philosophy, Ethics, Logic
- Notable ideas: Laws of sociality, Communality, Cheloveynik, Super-society, Complex logic

Alexander Alexandrovich Zinoviev (Russian: Алекса́ндр Алекса́ндрович Зино́вьев; 29 October 1922 – 10 May 2006) was a Soviet philosopher, writer, sociologist and journalist.

Coming from a poor peasant family, a participant in World War II, Alexander Zinoviev in the 1950s and 1960s was one of the symbols of the rebirth of philosophical thought in the Soviet Union. After the publication in the West of the screening book Yawning Heights, which brought Zinoviev world fame, in 1978 he was expelled from the country and deprived of Soviet citizenship. He returned to Russia in 1999.

The creative heritage of Zinoviev includes about 40 books, covering a number of areas of knowledge: sociology, social philosophy, mathematical logic, ethics, political thought. Most of his work is difficult to attribute to any tendency or to put in any framework, including academic. Having gained fame in the 1960s as a researcher of non-classical logic, in exile, Zinoviev was forced to become a professional writer, considering himself primarily a sociologist. Works in the original genre of the 'sociological novel' brought international recognition to Zinoviev. Often he is characterized as an independent Russian thinker, one of the greatest, most original and controversial figures of Russian social thought of the second half of the 20th century.

An anti-Stalinist in his youth, Zinoviev throughout his life held strong views on society, criticizing at first the Soviet system, then the Russian political system and the Western world, and at the end of his life, the processes of globalization. Zinoviev's worldview was distinguished by tragedy and pessimism. In the West, as in Russia, his non-conformist views were harshly criticized.

== Biography ==
=== Childhood and youth ===
Alexander Alexandrovich Zinoviev was born in the village of Pakhtino in the Chukhlomskoy Uyezd of Kostroma Governorate in the Russian Soviet Federative Socialist Republic (now the Chukhlomsky District of the Kostroma Oblast). He was the sixth child of Alexander Yakovlevich Zinoviev, a worker, and Apollinaria Vasilyevna (born Smirnova). The ancestors of Zinoviev, first mentioned in mid-18th-century documents, were state peasants. Zinoviev's father spent most of his time working in Moscow while living in the countryside. This gave him a Moscow residence permit, which probably saved his family from reprisals during the time of dekulakization. Before the revolution, Alexander Yakovlevich was an artist who decorated churches and painted icons, later expanding into finishing work and stencilling. Zinoviev somewhat disdainfully dismissed his father's profession as "painter." Alexander Yakovlevich had a keen interest in art. He provided his children with art supplies, illustrated magazines and books. Zinoviev's mother came from a wealthy family who owned property in Saint Petersburg. The Zinovievs, whose house stood in the center of the village, were respected in the district and often hosted guests. Biographers highlight the role of the mother in shaping Alexander's personality: Zinoviev recalled with love and respect her worldly wisdom and religious convictions, which determined the rules of behavior in the house. The family, however, was not religious. His father was a non-believer; his mother, although a believer, was indifferent to Church rites. From childhood, Alexander became a staunch atheist, looking all his life upon Orthodoxy, the church and its clergy with disgust. He considered atheism the only scientific component of Soviet Marxism.

Alexander from early childhood stood out for his abilities, he was immediately transferred to the second class. As children grew older, their father took them to the capital. In 1933, after graduating from elementary school, Alexander, on the advice of a mathematics teacher, was sent to Moscow. He lived with relatives in a 10-meter basement room on Bolshaya Spasskaya Street. Due to the impracticality of his father, he had to deal with economic issues. Beggarly living conditions combined with interesting activities; in those years, the Soviet state actively modernized school education, and the reforms were accompanied by the propaganda of its social significance. Alexander studied successfully; he liked mathematics and literature most of all. His participation in the drawing circle did not work out – his drawings revealed the features of caricatures, the confusion happened with the redrawing of the portrait of Stalin for the Stalin's room; The experience in the drama club was also unsuccessful (Alexander didn't have a hearing or voice). He read a lot additionally, was a frequenter of libraries; he read classics, both domestic and foreign. In high school, he was already familiar with a large number of philosophical works – from Voltaire, Diderot and Rousseau to Marx, Engels and Herzen. Of the Russian classics, Zinoviev particularly singled out Lermontov, knew by heart many of his poems; from modern authors – Mayakovsky. The most understandable and closest foreign writer was Hamsun ("Hunger"). As noted by the biographer Pavel Fokin, Zinoviev was attracted by the loneliness and pride of individualistic characters, which contributed to the formation of a sense of his own exclusiveness. He began to consciously cultivate this position of extreme individualism, although later he always denied it, calling himself "the ideal collectivist".

As biographers noted, in his youth, Zinoviev was seized with the desire to "build a new world" and faith in a "bright future", he was fascinated by dreams of social justice, the ideas of equality and collectivism, material asceticism; his idols were Spartacus, Robespierre, Decembrists and Populists. As Konstantin Krylov wrote, the ideas corresponded to his personal experience: Zinoviev recalled that "he was a beggar among beggars", emphasizing that the communist utopia was the idea of beggars. On the one hand, the social, cultural and economic changes that occurred in the 1930s contributed to optimism; on the other hand, Alexander noticed an increasing inequality, saw how families of party and state officials live; drew attention to the fact that in the advancement of the social scale the most successful were activists, demagogues, talkers and scammers; observed the discrimination of the peasants in comparison with the working class, the degradation of the village and the formation of the new "serfdom" of the collective farms, which he witnessed when he came on holidays in Pakhtino. Impressed by the famous book of Radishchev, he wanted to write an accusatory "Journey from Chukhloma to Moscow"; in 1935, after the promulgation of the draft Stalin constitution, he jokingly made up a fictional constitution in which "idlers and stupids" had "the right to the same marks as the honors pupils" (the story caused a school scandal, but the matter was hushed up). As Pavel Fokin writes, "the exploits and meanness" of Soviet society, the contradictions and problems of everyday life provoked a "spiritual rebellion". According to the interpretation of Konstantin Krylov, disappointment in the practical implementation of the ideals of communism did not encourage young Zinoviev to deny the very idea of communism, or to search for other ideals. He chose the third way, concluding that evil is inevitably inherent in the social world, and that this world is essentially evil. This position later influenced his sociology.

In the Komsomol, Zinoviev was a member of the school committee, and was responsible for the publication of a satirical newspaper. The choice of philosophy as a future specialty was influenced by a teacher of social sciences, a graduate student of the Moscow Institute of Philosophy, Literature, and History – the main humanitarian university of those years in the Soviet Union. Together with his teacher, Alexander began to study the works of Marx and Engels, and was fascinated by dialectics. After graduating from school in 1939 with honors, he entered the Moscow Institute of Philosophy, Literature and History (other options were math and architecture). Among his fellow students were later well-known philosophers Arseny Gulyga, Igor Narsky, Dmitry Gorsky and Pavel Kopnin. The atmosphere at the institute, the forge of the "fighters of the ideological front", was heavy. Zinoviev was almost without funds, the meager scholarship was not enough, his father stopped helping him. As Pavel Fokin writes, Zinoviev was in a state of physical and nervous exhaustion. In search of an answer to the question of why the bright ideals of communism proclaimed were at variance with reality, Zinoviev thought about the figure of Stalin: "The Father of Nations" became the cause of the perversion of communist ideals.

=== Early anti-Stalinism. War years ===
According to the memoirs of Zinoviev, while still in school, he had the idea to kill Stalin, which he repeatedly discussed with close friends; The "plan" failed because they did not find a weapon. In Moscow Institute of Philosophy, Literature and History, at the next Komsomol meeting at the end of 1939, Zinoviev emotionally spoke about the troubles and injustices that took place in the village, and openly criticized the personality cult of Stalin. Zinoviev was sent for a psychiatric examination, and then expelled from the Komsomol and Moscow Institute of Philosophy, Literature and History. According to his memoirs, he was arrested and interrogated at the Lubyanka. Zinoviev recalled that the investigators were confident that someone had inspired his views to him, so they planned to let him go to reveal the entire anti-Soviet group. When transferred to one of the apartments of the People's Commissariat for Internal Affairs, Zinoviev managed to escape. He hid in different places: he left for Pakhtino for a while, then he wandered, and later returned to Moscow. At the end of 1940, he joined the Red Army to avoid persecution. In the military enlistment office he called himself "Zenoviev", saying that he had lost his passport.

Subsequently, Zinoviev often returned to this story, including in his memoirs "The Confession of the Outcast", calling that year the "year of horror". This episode of the biography is in general terms mentioned in encyclopedic publications, its credibility is generally not questioned by biographers and commentators. Pavel Fokin pointed out that the arrest and search documents were not kept, therefore it is difficult to establish the exact chronology of events. Konstantin Krylov noted that sincerity and lack of heroism in the descriptions of events testify in favor of their authenticity. A Swiss literary critic Georges Niva believed that Zinoviev later constructed his biography around the complex of a terrorist whose rebellion remained imaginary. As a result, his whole life became a fierce resistance to the course of history, in this context, it does not matter whether the murder of Stalin was planned in reality.

Zinoviev spent most of the war at the Ulyanovsk Aviation School. Initially, he served in the Primorsky Territory as part of the cavalry division. In the spring of 1941, the troops were transferred to the west, he was credited with a tank gunner in a tank regiment. On the eve of 22 June, the advanced unit was sent to a flight school in Orsha, which was soon evacuated to Gorky, and in early 1942 to the Ulyanovsk military aviation school of pilots. At the aviation school, Zinoviev spent almost three years, mostly in reserve. He learned to fly a biplane, later – on the Il-2. In Ulyanovsk, he had a son, named Valery (1944). He graduated from the aviation school at the end of 1944 and received the title of "junior lieutenant". He fought in the 2nd Guards Ground Attack Aviation Corps, the first combat flight on the IL-2 took place in March 1945 during the capture of Glogau. Participated in battles in Poland and Germany, and was awarded the Order of the Red Star. The war ended in Grassau on 8 May. Zinoviev recalled that the flights were enjoyable: I liked to feel like the owner of a combat vehicle, drop bombs, shoot cannons and machine guns; the fear of perishing was relieved by the realization that "this is only once". After the war, he served a year on the territory of Czechoslovakia, Hungary and Austria. Zinoviev was frustrated by the senselessness of military service, and repeatedly tried to quit, but failed. Six years in the army gave Zinoviev rich material for understanding Soviet society, and monitoring social relations and dynamics, the army represented a large-scale social laboratory, in which features of social processes were manifested or even caricatured.

=== Moscow State University and postgraduate period (1946–1954) ===
After his dismissal from the army in 1946, Zinoviev took his mother and younger brothers from the village to Moscow. He managed to recover at the Faculty of Philosophy of Moscow State University, with which the Moscow Institute of Philosophy, Literature and History was united. He had to look for odd jobs – the scholarship was not enough. During his studies, Zinoviev managed to work as a loader, excavator and watchman, and was engaged in the manufacture of fake bread cards and donated blood. In 1950–1952 he taught logic and psychology at school. He originally did not plan a philosophical career, he thought of becoming a writer. He wrote "A Tale of Duty" (or "A Tale of Betrayal"), the main character of which was an informant – "a whistleblower of enemies". Zinoviev took the manuscript to the magazine "October", where Vasily Ilyenkov, the father of Evald Ilyenkov, worked, and to the New World, headed by Konstantin Simonov. Reviews of the reviewers were negative, and Zinoviev destroyed the manuscript on the advice of Simonov. As Pavel Fokin writes, the failure had a strong effect on Zinoviev, he led an unbridled lifestyle: he drank, did not follow his health. The work in the wall newspaper helped him to overcome the situation and focus on philosophy, where he began writing epigrams, parodies, humorous poems, and wrote colorful "life stories" that, Pavel Fokin noted, seemed so plausible that even the author sometimes believed in them.

In the post-war years, the faculty of philosophy was "on the forefront" of the ideological front – the "biggest event" was the speech of the secretary of the Central Committee Andrei Zhdanov (1947), followed by the strengthening of the party's role in philosophical education. Conferences were held to study the work of Stalin, In 1948 the tenth anniversary of the "brilliant Stalinist work" – "A Short Course in the History of the All-Union Communist Party (Bolsheviks)" was widely celebrated. Zinoviev studied mostly "excellently", mastering Marxist texts was not a big deal; he studied Kant, Marx and Hegel before the war. Teachers were the subject of his ridicule and satirical caricatures popular among students, his aphorisms were part of philosophical folklore; he was inclined to self-irony. According to the memoirs of Vadim Mezhuyev, Zinoviev won the competition for the best definition of matter: "matter is an objective reality given to us in sensations by God". Zinoviev ironically recalled how the "tongue-tied marazmatik Bugaev" from the first classes inspired students with superiority over all the previous philosophy; another object of ridicule, Beletsky, pointed out through a window to "objective truth" – the Kremlin. The exception was the historian of philosophy, Valentin Asmus, with whom Zinoviev had a warm relationship all his life.

The closest friend of the not too sentimental Zinoviev was Karl Kantor. Friendship with Evald Ilyenkov, who studied for an older course, rather represented rivalry: both were intellectual leaders of student companies (theoretical conversations were often held in eateries), which were later added by Boris Grushin, Merab Mamardashvili, Georgy Shchedrovitsky, Alexander Piatigorsky, Len Karpinsky, Yuri Karyakin, Yuri Levada. According to the memoirs of Pyatigorsky, Zinoviev "became everything for me at the faculty". As Karl Kantor wrote, Zinoviev did not have a specific subject, he taught the critical view of the dogmatism of the Marxist–Leninist curriculum, and considered habitual topics from a new, often unexpected angle. His penchant for independent thinking attracted both students and graduate students, sometimes even teachers, including Asmus. Karl Kantor recalled:

...he told me in the 1948, that Engels was the first vulgarizer of Marxism. I answered: "Sasha, fear God, how so? Engels did this, that...". "All this is correct, he continued, but you read "The Dialectic of Nature", – this is utter nonsense, the whole dialectic of nature is contrived, will you find something like this in Marx?". This is a memory of one moment of such a critical blow to consciousness, as opposed to what was said. He despised Lenin's work "Materialism and Empirio-Criticism", he called it "Mtsizm-Mtsizm". "Have you tried", he asks me, "ever read Mach and Avenarius?" I say – "I did not try". He says: "Try. They are ten heads taller than Lenin, who criticizes them. He criticizes Bogdanov. Have you read Bogdanov?", etc.

In everyday life, Zinoviev did not hide the anti-Stalinist views, openly and consistently condemning, for example, the antisemitic campaign. As Alexander Pyatigorsky recalled, Zinoviev "was not afraid of anything"; he was one of the few who continued to communicate with Karl Kantor in the midst of the struggle against cosmopolitanism, demonstratively releasing "antisemitic" jokes about his friend. Georgy Shchedrovitsky recalled that Zinoviev hated Soviet socialism, in which socialist principles superimposed on archaic social structures (mass bonded labor and camps), but which corresponded to the national character and cultural traditions. Pessimism was intensified by the fact that socialism was considered as the inevitable and unalternative future of mankind. In future society, Zinoviev did not see a place for himself, because he did not consider himself to be in any class and believed that he had survived by a miracle. Konstantin Krylov, commenting on Shchedrovitsky's memories, referred Zinoviev to the victims of the Russian Revolution and contrasted him in this sense to Shchedrovitsky, who recognized that his personal prospects were more optimistic because of social status.

In the third year Zinoviev became interested in the logic of Capital, Marx was devoted to his diploma. After graduating in 1951 with honors from the university, he entered graduate school. In Capital, Zinoviev was interested in the logical structure, rather than the economic or political description of capitalism, the dissertation considered the logical techniques used by Marx. In Soviet dogma, the subject of Zinoviev's research, like that of Ilyenkov's similar research, was called "dialectical logic". Vladislav Lektorsky connects the turn of Zinoviev and Ilyenkov to the study of theoretical thinking and methodology with the conviction that strict knowledge can influence bureaucratic "real socialism" and reform the Soviet system. According to Pavel Fokin, appeal to logic was an act of self-preservation in the conditions of Soviet reality, unwillingness to engage in ideological propaganda within the framework of historical materialism – logic was outside of party or class interests.

In 1952, Zinoviev and his students Grushin, Mamardashvili and Shchedrovitsky established the Moscow Logic Circle. The participants tried to develop a so-called "genetically meaningful" logic – an alternative to both semi-official dialectical logic and formal logic. The activity of the circle took place against the backdrop of the revival of the atmosphere at the philosophical faculty after Stalin's death. At the beginning of 1954, a discussion was held on "Disagreements on Logic Issues", which divided "dialecticians", formal logicians and "heretics" from the circle – the so-called "easel painters". In another discussion, Zinoviev said a well-known phrase that "earlier bourgeois philosophers explained the world, and now Soviet philosophers do not do this", which caused the applause of the audience. After discussions, members of the group were summoned to the Committee for State Security, but there was no repression. Zinoviev's Ph.D. thesis "The Method of Ascent from the Abstract to the Concrete (on the Material of Karl Marx's "Capital") was twice "filled up" at the Faculty Academic Council, it was possible to defend oneself from the third time, already in Higher Attestation Commission, in September 1954. The opposition of the "old men" was counterbalanced by the support of the Minister of Culture Academician George Alexandrov, which he managed to get through Karl Kantor. The opponents were Teodor Oizerman and Pavel Kopnin, the post-graduate students Mamardashvili and Grushin and Schedrovitsky supported the defense of Zinoviev. The text of the dissertation was later distributed in numerous reprints in samizdat and was published only in 2002. The peripetias of those events Zinoviev grotesque described in the novel "On the Eve of Paradise".

In 1951, Zinoviev married, in 1954, his daughter Tamara was born, a year later, the couple received a small room in a communal flat. The marriage was partly calculated (Tamara Filatieva was the daughter of a People's Commissariat for Internal Affairs worker), partly out of love, but family life did not work out – each had their own professional interests, and misunderstanding increased. The situation was aggravated by the continued drunkenness of Zinoviev.

=== Career takeoff: science and teaching (1955–1968) ===
Zinoviev gradually lost interest in the logical circle, where Shchedrovitsky moved to the role of leader. Zinoviev had his own ambitions, he was not satisfied with the "collective farm" and "party" model circle (as per Pavel Fokin). In 1955, he received the position of junior researcher at the Institute of Philosophy of the Academy of Sciences of the Soviet Union (sector of dialectical materialism), where he felt comfortable. The institute was primarily an ideological institution with rigid orders, but a certain revival (as described by Vladislav Lektorsky) of philosophical thought in the 1950s made it possible to pursue science, including in the field of logic, which Zinoviev recognized. In the second half of the 1950s, the formation of logical science took place, textbooks, collections, collective monographs were published, and methodological seminars were held. Zinoviev was actively involved in scientific work, but the first articles were rejected at sector meetings, which, according to Pavel Fokin, was an echo of the story of Ilyenkov, who was then persecuted. Group mates (Mamardashvili and others) considered the choice of mathematical logic as an academic career as a departure from the struggle in the direction of security and well-being; Zinoviev's disciple Yury Solodukhin drew attention to his disappointment in the speculative nature of Marxism.

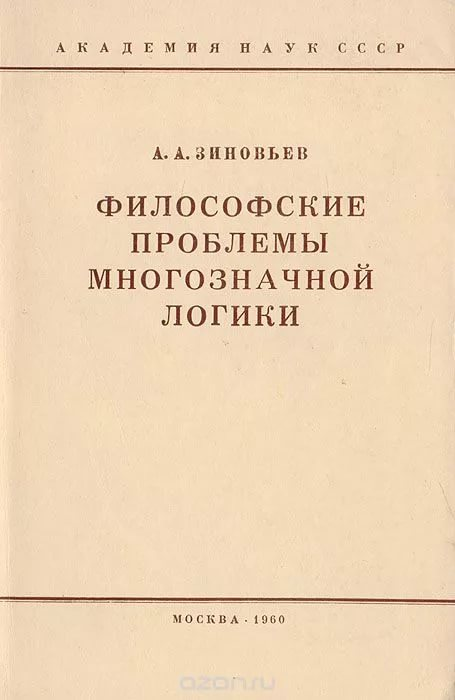

The first publications took place in 1957, a year later one of the articles was published in Czech. For fifteen years (1960–1975) Zinoviev published a number of monographs and many articles on non-classical logic. Academic career developed rapidly: in 1960, Zinoviev became a senior researcher, in November 1962, by unanimous decision of the Academic Council of the Institute of Philosophy of the Academy of Sciences of the Soviet Union, received a doctorate for his study "The logic of statements and the theory of inference". Opponents of the defense were Valentin Asmus, Sofya Yanovskaya and Igor Narsky. In 1958–1960, he read the special course "The Philosophical Problems of Natural Science" at the Moscow Institute of Physics and Technology, since 1961 – the special course at Moscow State University (faculty of philosophy). In 1966 he received the title of professor, in 1967–1968, part-time headed the department of logic, Faculty of Philosophy, Moscow State University. In 1968, he joined the editorial board of the journal Problems of Philosophy, a year later – on the Academic Council on the problems of dialectical materialism of the Institute of Philosophy of the Academy of Sciences of the Soviet Union. By the mid-1970s, his works were published in English, German, Italian, and Polish. Zinoviev was engaged in logic not just as a scientific discipline, but reconsidered its foundations as part of the creation of a new field of intellectual activity. According to Konstantin Krylov, he experienced a temporary stage of creating a "general theory of everything", which, however, he quickly passed. It is noted that in logical studies Zinoviev was clearly vain, which led to imprudent steps and embarrassment: for example, he insistently published proof of Fermat's unprovability in the framework of the logical system he built.

At Moscow State University, Zinoviev formed a group of followers from domestic and foreign students and graduate students. Listeners recalled that Zinoviev was impressive with his erudition, his classes were not "lectures on paper", but improvisations on a given topic, offering a systematic vision of the problem, a dynamic creative search. According to the memoirs of the physicist Peter Barashev, who studied at the Moscow Institute of Physics and Technology, Zinoviev forced to read the originals of the original sources, evaluate each text used, look for not only the strengths, but also the weaknesses of scientific works. He rather sharply and emotionally criticized his predecessors and opponents, but he treated students warmly, seeing them as like-minded people, communicated informally, took them to exhibitions, to the cinema, to cafes. Listener of Zinoviev Valery Rhodes recalled:

He did not finish speaking to the point of practically no phrases. His thought rushed with such speed that the words could not keep up... For the lecturer this is unacceptable... I wrote a lecture word for word, I came home – you will never understand it yourself. No predicates. That which says that it affects.

A successful career was overshadowed by the fact that Zinoviev was in fact "restricted to leave", although the scientist was repeatedly invited to foreign events. His candidacy for international travel was usually wrapped up at various stages, starting in 1961, when he was not given a visa to Poland. Scientific work did not interfere with observing and analyzing social reality, primarily using the example of the Institute of Philosophy, as well as engaging in ethical searches, introspection and self-reflection. In the first half of the 1960s, he formulated an ethical position about the complete independence of his personality from society. Around 1963, it was possible to overcome alcohol dependence, which lasted throughout the postwar years; in the same year he divorced. In 1965 he got acquainted with stenographer Olga Sorokina, who was 23 years younger, four years later they got married. Olga Mironovna became his faithful ally for life; Zinoviev often spoke of her invaluable help and support. The daughters of Polina (1971) and Xenia (1990) were born in marriage. In 1967, Zinoviev was not released to the international congress on logic in Amsterdam, although he was included in the official composition of the Soviet delegation. Long-term participation in philosophical "gatherings..., in which he spoke with negative views on certain issues of the theory of Marxism–Leninism" (Committee for State Security analytical note) and contacts with American logicians in 1960, according to the Committee for State Security who worked for American intelligence, had their effect. The Organs confined themselves to a conversation (Zinoviev insisted that communication with the Americans had exclusively professional goals), which ended in a curiosity: having learned that he was renting a room, he was given a one-room apartment on Vavilova Street. In the early 1970s, having made an exchange, the Zinovievs moved into a four-room apartment, he had his own office. Later, Zinoviev remarked: "The improvement of living conditions played a huge role in the growth of opposition and rebellious attitudes in the country".

=== Dissident Zinoviev. "Yawning Heights" ===
In scientific and teaching activities, Zinoviev openly ignored the official ideology, in the late 1960s his position in the scientific community deteriorated. As Pavel Fokin writes, he declined the proposal of the vice-president of the Academy of Sciences of the Soviet Union, Pyotr Fedoseyev, to write a "Marxist–Leninist" article for the journal Kommunist, although he was promised his own department and election as a corresponding member. The scientist was in conflict with representatives of the "liberal" wing of the Soviet intelligentsia, and, as biographers believe, their attitude towards Zinoviev was worse than that of the orthodox communists. In the "liberal" composition of the editorial board of the journal Problems of Philosophy (Merab Mamardashvili, Bonifaty Kedrov, Theodor Oizerman, Yuri Zamoshkin, Vladislav Kelle) took an extremely sharp position on the quality of the reviewed works, indignant at the authors raid over Leonid Brezhnev; Zinoviev noted "(Russian: б. с. к., romanized: b. s. k.)" – "(Russian: бред сивой кобылы, romanized: Delirium of the grey mare – Bullshit)" – to texts that could not be criticized. After the suspension of his publications, Zinoviev left the editorial board. In the fall of 1968, he was fired from the post of head of the department of logic at Moscow State University. He openly made friends with the well-known dissident Alexander Esenin-Volpin, inviting him to seminars on logic, and with Ernst Neizvestny, who he often visited. He continued his scientific activities, preparing graduate students. In 1973 he was not re-elected to the Academic Council of the institute, a year later he was not allowed to speak at the All-Union Symposium on the theory of logical inference; they were not allowed to travel abroad, in particular, to Finland and Canada; problems arose with his graduate students. At the same time, Zinoviev was elected a foreign member of the Finnish Academy of Sciences (1974) after a visit to the Soviet Union by the famous Finnish logician Georg von Wright. Zinoviev was proud of this fact, Finnish logic had a high scientific authority.

After the Prague events, Zinoviev came up with the idea of a satirical book about Soviet reality. The book, entitled "Yawning Heights", has grown from a series of articles written in the early 1970s; among them – an essay about Ernst Neizvestny, dedicated to the fate of talent in society. Then he began to paint. Forwarded articles to the West, they were published in Poland and Czechoslovakia, unsigned articles were distributed in samizdat. The main part of the book was conspiratorially written in a removable cottage in Peredelkino in the summer of 1974 and was completed by early 1975. Zinoviev wrote cleanly, the wife played the role of proofreader and editor. With the help of acquaintances, the manuscript (almost a thousand typewritten pages) was sent to France. Zinoviev did not count on a quick publication, for various reasons all Russian-language publishing houses rejected the manuscript. The publisher was Vladimir Dmitrievich, a Serb who popularized Russian literature for the French-speaking reader; he accidentally saw the manuscript, and he really liked it. Shortly before publication after another refusal of a trip abroad (logical colloquium in Finland) in June 1976, Zinoviev went into open conflict with the authorities. He invited Western journalists to his home and made a protest statement, and then turned in a party card at the Institute of Philosophy. The change was accompanied by comical circumstances: the party secretary, being an ideological communist, tried to dissuade Zinoviev from his step, refusing to accept the party membership card. Taking Zinoviev out of the office, he locked himself and several times pushed the document under the door.

"Yawning Heights" represented a keen satire on the Soviet way of life. In August 1976, the book was published in Russian in the Lausanne publishing house of Dmitrievich "L'Âge d'homme". The publication was accompanied by lighting on the radio, the book was advertised by the emigre writer Vladimir Maximov. "Yawning Heights" had success with the Western reader, the novel was translated into two dozen languages. Reviews of reviewers in different countries were generally positive, sometimes even enthusiastic, the novel received several awards, in particular the European Charles Weyonne Prize for essay. The book was considered as a literary event out of touch with the Soviet context. Zinoviev was called the heir to the satirical tradition – from Aristophanes and Apuleius through François Rabelais and Jonathan Swift to Saltykov-Shchedrin, Anatole France, Franz Kafka and George Orwell. Among dissidents, the reaction was more heterogeneous, there were also negative opinions, for example, among Andrei Sakharov, who called the book decadent, or Alexander Solzhenitsyn. In the Soviet Union, the book was immediately declared anti-Soviet, its reading was equated with anti-Soviet activity; "Yawning Heights" were actively distributed in samizdat. As Lev Mitrokhin recalled, despite the flaws, the book made a strong impression by "author's ingenuity, imagery, accuracy of social diagnosis, and violent black humor". Many intellectuals, for example, mocked in the novel Mamardashvili, considered the book a libel or even a denunciation.

The latest libel [the "Bright Future" novel] contains extremely cynical slanderous fabrications about Soviet reality, the theory and practice of communist construction, and offensive attacks against Vladimir Lenin, our party and its leadership. The Soviet Zinoviev society slanderously portrays it as "a model of communism with barbed wire... in four rows". The author exposes the Soviet people to particularly rude insults: "Our norm is the most disgusting qualities of human nature... and this whole filth is covered with the most grandiose and most deceitful ideology".

— From the note of the Committee for State Security of the Soviet Union No. 1311-A "On measures to curb the anti-Soviet activities of Alexander Zinoviev"

On 2 December 1976 he was expelled from the Communist Party of the Soviet Union at the general institute party meeting (Zinoviev did not show up for it), and then deprived of scientific titles for "anti-patriotic actions incompatible with the title of Soviet scientist" and dismissed from the Institute of Philosophy. In early 1977, by decision of the Presidium of the Supreme Soviet of the Soviet Union, Zinoviev was deprived of all state awards, including military, and academic degrees. He was even expelled from the Philosophical Society, of which he was not a member. Relatives were also affected: the son Valery and daughter Tamara lost their jobs; Brother Vasily, a military lawyer with the rank of lieutenant colonel, refused to publicly condemn his brother, for which he was dismissed from the army and expelled from Moscow. Zinoviev was left without a livelihood, he sold books and albums from his home collection, illegally edited scientific texts, and sometimes well-wishers helped financially, for example, Pyotr Kapitsa. Numerous dissidents and foreign journalists actively talked with Zinoviev (Raisa Lehrth, Sofiya Kalistratova, Roy Medvedev, Peter Abovin-Egides, Vladimir Voinovich and others). As stated in a note by the Committee for State Security for the Central Committee of the Communist Party of the Soviet Union, signed by Yuri Andropov, Zinoviev received at home "anti-Soviet-minded individuals" and "renegades", discussed "anti-Soviet actions", gave "slanderous information" to correspondents of capitalist countries to "attract attention to his person". Zinoviev continued to write, soon finishing the story "The Night Watchman's Notes", the novel "On the Eve of Paradise" and the novel "A Bright Future", published in Switzerland in early 1978.

=== In emigration: against "real communism" ===
The novel "A Bright Future" contained personal insults to the General Secretary of the Central Committee of the Communist Party of the Soviet Union Leonid Brezhnev. In June 1978, at the suggestion of the Committee for State Security, the Politburo of the Central Committee of the Communist Party of the Soviet Union made a rather mild decision to expel Zinoviev abroad. According to the Committee for State Security note, criminal prosecution would lead to placement in a psychiatric institution (Zinoviev was characterized as a "mentally unstable" former alcoholic suffering from "delusions of grandeur"), which was considered inexpedient because of the campaign against Soviet psychiatry in the West. Zinoviev received invitations from universities in Europe and the United States, in particular, from the president of the Ludwig-Maximilians-Universität München (LMU) philosopher Nikolaus Lobkowitz, who knew his logical works. Zinoviev was supported by the Austrian Federal Chancellor Bruno Kreisky and the German Foreign Minister Hans-Dietrich Genscher, who touched upon his fate at a meeting with Leonid Brezhnev. On 6 August 1978, Zinoviev, with his wife and seven-year-old daughter, left for Germany. At the first press conference in Munich, which attracted a lot of attention from the press, Zinoviev said that he did not feel that he was a "victim of the regime", but considered the regime to be his victim. He distanced himself from the human rights and dissident movement and critically assessed the possibilities of democratization in the Soviet Union. Shortly after these statements, a decree was issued by the Presidium of the Supreme Soviet of the Soviet Union to deprive Zinoviev of Soviet citizenship.

From August 1978 to July 1999 he lived with his family in Munich, earned literary work and public lectures, not having a stable place of work. He briefly taught logic at the Ludwig-Maximilians-Universität München; his presence as a lecturer being rather political in nature. After the "Bright Future" (Medici Award for the Best Foreign Book of the Year in France) for several years, "scientific and literary" novels and novels "Night Watchman's Notes", "On the Eve of Paradise", "Yellow House", and "Homo Sovieticus" were published, "Go to Golgatha", "The Wings of Our Youth" and others. Theoretical reflections on Soviet society compiled the book Communism as Reality (Alexis de Tocqueville Prize for Humanism). Zinoviev worked daily, wrote almost without drafts. Text fragments were thought out in advance, often during walks, lectures or conversations. By his own admission, he worked erratically, but continuously. A dozen reviews were published for each book in France, Germany and Italy, the books were well received by Western readers, with whom Zinoviev often met. In 1980, he admitted that he did not expect to meet such a thoughtful and understanding reader in the West. The books were published in many European languages, in Japan and the US, where the "Yawning Heights" were published in 1979. In addition to literary awards, he received public awards: he was elected a member of the Roman Academy of Sciences, the Bavarian Academy of Fine Arts. In 1984, the documentary film "Alexander Zinoviev. Reflections of the writer in exile", in Munich, an exhibition of his paintings and cartoons. In 1986, a conference on his work was held in London.

In the first half of the 1980s, Zinoviev led an active public activities, enjoyed great popularity in the media, especially in France, Germany and Italy. He was almost the main newsmaker of Russian emigration. Publications of his books in different countries were published quarterly, Zinoviev participated in presentations, attended various congresses and symposia, where he gave reports, participated in conversations, gave interviews. Eduard Limonov recalled:

When I settled in France in 1980, he was at the zenith of fame. He was invited to television to comment on any event in Russia, any sneeze, not to mention the death of the general secretaries.

Numerous speeches and journalistic articles made up the collections "We and the West", "Without Illusions", "Neither Freedom, nor Equality, nor Brotherhood". Zinoviev defended his understanding of the Soviet system, wrote a lot about the relationship between capitalism and communism, the West and the East. He criticized the West for underestimating the communist threat due to a lack of understanding of the nature of Soviet society. The West assessed the Soviet system through its own criteria, however, Zinoviev argued that Western democracy and communism are completely different. He denied the role of the personal qualities of the Soviet leaders, considering them "social symbols", and urged the West not to listen to their promises. In 1983, in his report "Marxist ideology and religion" at a symposium in Vienna, he asserted that "spiritual rebirth" in the Soviet Union would not affect the official ideology, and Andropov's policy would not lead to reforms or social protest. A year later, in a series of representative events dedicated to Orwell's 1984 novel, he sharply criticized the adequacy of the description in the book of the communist society. From his point of view, the book was not a scientific prediction, but reflected Orwell's contemporaries' fear of imaginary communism.

In emigration, Zinoviev felt alone, despite his popularity, dynamic life and relative comfort – he lived in a three-room apartment on the very outskirts of Munich, his earnings by European standards were rather modest. Zinoviev tried to avoid the emigrant community, close relations were formed only with Vladimir Maximov; European intellectuals were friends with Friedrich Dürrenmatt. The language barrier was also a problem - Zinoviev mastered professional vocabulary, but on the whole, he did not know German well, spoke mainly in English. The expression of loneliness became the oil painting "Self-portrait", according to Pavel Fokin, the image of suffering, pain, truth and hopelessness. In the essay "Why I will never return to the Soviet Union" (1984), nostalgia and the desire to return to Russia were combined with the realization that "there is nowhere to return, there is no need to return, there is no one to return"; in 1988, in an interview with Radio Liberty, he stated that he considered his emigration a punishment, and his principle was "always to write the truth and only the truth". According to Georges Niva, Zinoviev grew nostalgia for collectivist communism, he paradoxically turned from the accuser of communism into his apologist, which was manifested in the novel "The Wings of Our Youth". In the book, as in a number of speeches, Zinoviev argued that after 1953 he ceased to be an anti-Stalinist, because he understood that Stalinism arose "from below" and was not a product of Stalin.

=== The Catastroika and the 1990s ===
Zinoviev took Perestroika in a sharply negative way, calling it "Catastroika". Mikhail Gorbachev and his associates were described as demagogues, hypocrites, cynical careerists and "insignificance" who had no scientific understanding of the nature of Soviet communism. Since 1985, in numerous articles and speeches, he asserted that the social system in the Soviet Union would not change, restructuring he considered bureaucratic formality, and her initiatives – from glasnost to the anti-alcohol campaign – a manifestation of the leadership's inability to adequately assess real problems. From his point of view, the "revolution from above", carried out with the support of the indifferent to the fate of ordinary Soviet people of the West, could only lead to a catastrophe. This "attack on Gorbachev" provoked a negative reaction from the majority of intellectuals in the West, who welcomed the restructuring. Zinoviev's views were explained by eccentricities, outrageous, even madness. Controversial articles and interviews compiled a collection of "Gorbachevism"; The book "Catastroika" (1989) described the provincial "Party City", where officials, driven by vested interests, imitate the implementation of reforms. In 1987 and 1989, Zinoviev visited Chile twice; during his second trip, he was accepted by Augusto Pinochet. He conducted a lecture tour of the United States, and a series of successful creative evenings in Israel. The attention of the press was attracted by the exhibition of drawings "Allegra Rusia" ("Fun of Russia") on the topic of Soviet drunkenness, held in Milan in 1989. The project was a "conceptual sociological comic" (as per Pavel Fokin). At the suggestion of French publishers wrote a memoir entitled "The Confession of the Outcast". The book combined biographical memories and sociological and philosophical reflections.

As a critic of Gorbachev and the restructuring of Zinoviev in March 1990, he was invited to a debate on the French TV channel with "disgraced" Boris Yeltsin, then the Soviet Union People's Deputy, little-known in Europe. Zinoviev criticized Yeltsin's desire to "speed up" the restructuring, said he saw the character of his books in him, and called his promises about the abolition of privileges demagogic and unfulfilled. Pavel Fokin noted that in his assessments Zinoviev hyperbolized Gorbachev's political role in the Soviet Union, without noticing Yeltsin's figure. After the debate, interest in Zinoviev arose in Moscow, which was full of political events, and his articles and interviews began to appear in the Soviet press. On 1 July 1990, by decree of the President of the Soviet Union, Zinoviev was restored to Soviet citizenship, to which he reacted without enthusiasm, explaining that publishing his books was important for him. In 1990 in the Soviet Union with a circulation of 250 thousand copies "Yawning Heights" were released, in 1991 the novels "Homo Soveticus", "Para Bellum" and "Go to Golgatha" were published (in the magazine "Smena"); at the same time, the Higher Attestation Commission restored his academic degrees.

In the article "I want to tell you about the West", published in Komsomolskaya Pravda (1990), Zinoviev spoke with contempt of the "brave men" who "spit on everything Soviet", but distanced themselves from the defenders of Soviet history; he criticized the idealization of the image of the West, arguing that Western notions of market, democracy, multi-party system are inadequate to Soviet conditions and even destructive. In a response to the polemical article by Mark Zakharov entitled "Come back, mate!", the author sarcastically suggested that Zinoviev leave the world of "moneybags and exploiters" and return from the "wicked West" in the Soviet Union. The article outlined the themes of the numerous speeches of Zinoviev in the 1990s, mainly in the opposition press of the Yeltsin regime in the Russian press, as well as his critical analysis of the modern West and globalization processes in the books West, Global Human Rights and On the Road to Super-Society.

In the conflict of the "democrats" with the "red-brown" he took the position of defender of Soviet communism, describing the Soviet period as the pinnacle of Russian history. The defeat of the State Committee on the State of Emergency Zinoviev called the historical tragedy and negatively evaluated the collapse of the Soviet Union; about Yeltsin and Russian reformers, he repeatedly spoke disparagingly, used extremely harsh expressions ("idiots", "scum", "cretins", "elitsinoidy", etc.), demanding punitive measures against them. At the presentation in Rome of the Italian literary prize "Tevere" in 1992, he denied the possibility of success of Russian reforms, believing that they would only lead to a catastrophe. At the same time, he called Stalin the only great politician in the history of Russia, which, Konstantin Krylov notes, was not at all praise, but shocked the public. In several speeches, he argued that Russia would never become a Western country; called the Russian regime "colonial democracy", and Westernization – a special form of colonization, aimed at defeating and disintegrating Russia in the interests of the West. After another interview (1994) in the newspaper "Zavtra", where Zinoviev openly called for the overthrow of the anti-people regime "traitors and collaborators", a criminal case was opened against his interviewer, Vladimir Bondarenko. Zinoviev had to explain that his words expressed the position of a scientist, not a politician.

=== Return to Russia and last years ===
From the mid-1990s, Zinoviev began to visit his homeland more often, he had supporters and followers with whom he willingly communicated. In 1996, he confessed that he was not going to return to Russia that was "hostile", despite the publication of his books (Embroilment, Russian Experiment, etc.). He believed that he was "boycotted" in Russia, as, incidentally, in the West, where he managed to publish with difficulty. Nevertheless, in France, in the publishing house "Plon" in 1996 "West" was released, two years later in Italy it became the bestseller "The Global Humant Hill". As Pavel Fokin writes, the turning point was the fall of 1997, when he visited Russia several times. Zinoviev represented the "Global Humant Hill" in Moscow, and held a series of meetings with Sergey Baburin, Nikolai Ryzhkov and Gennady Zyuganov. Zinoviev called for a vote for the Communist leader in the 1996 presidential election, considering the Communist Party of the Russian Federation one of the few positive political forces in the country, although his position was more radical than that of the parliamentary Communist opposition. Zinoviev's 75th anniversary was celebrated at the Presidium of the Academy of Sciences and at the Institute of Philosophy; he visited his native Kostroma Region, and in 1998 made a number of trips around Russia and the CIS. On 30 June 1999 the Zinoviev family returned to Moscow. A few days later he was accepted as a professor at Moscow State University (Department of Ethics at the Faculty of Philosophy) and Maxim Gorky Literature Institute. At the end of the year, at the suggestion of Baburin, he agreed to participate in the Duma elections on the list of the Russian All-People's Union, but was not registered.

The decision to return was influenced by the bombing of Yugoslavia, which Zinoviev repeatedly condemned. He believed that the war in the Balkans was being waged against Europe, which meant its degradation and marked the arrival of a new, post-democratic and post-communist totalitarianism. In the last Western interview "Why I am returning to Russia", published in "Le Monde", Zinoviev stated catastrophic changes in the West and Russia, the surrender of Europe before Americanization and globalization, the betrayal of its ideals (democracy, freedom of speech, moral values, etc.). He stated that returning to Russia, he remains committed to genuine European values. Slobodan Milošević (the philosopher who met him in 1999), like Muammar Gaddafi, symbolized for Zinoviev the challenge and resistance of globalization, and insubordination to America, caused his admiration and respect.

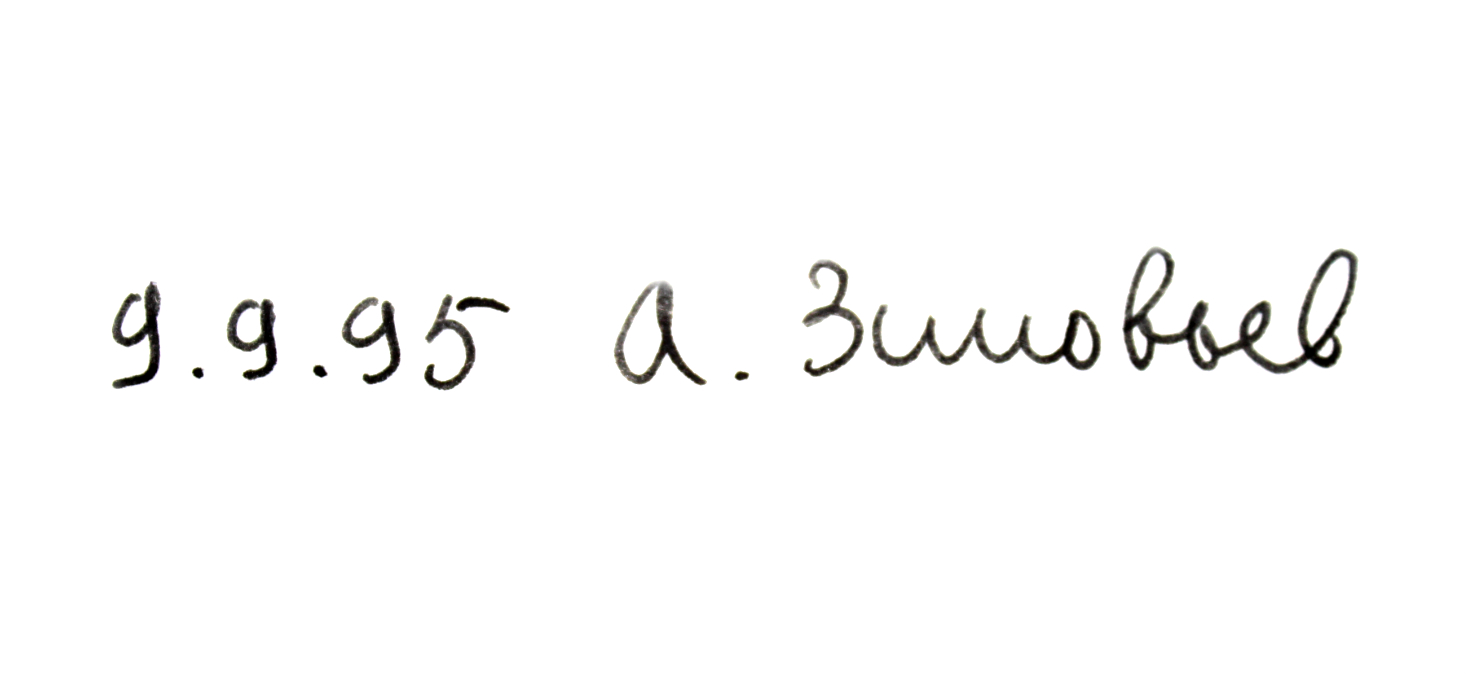
Autograph of Alexander Zinoviev (1995)

Zinoviev spoke positively about Vladimir Putin, pinned great hopes on him, considering his coming to power as the country's first chance after 1985 to break the deadlock and to resist Westernization and colonization. However, he rather quickly revised optimistic estimates, noting at the end of 2000 that Russia continued to lose ground, although he did not rank Putin as a "traitor". In 2002, he wrote that Putin, having popular support, did not use the historical chance, refusing to revise the results of privatization and nationalize finance and energy; Zinoviev concluded that Putin's historical role was to legitimize the consequences of the Yeltsin coup. In 2006, shortly before his death, he stated that Russia as a sovereign state and a single whole no longer exists, the country presents an imitation ("apparent"), an artificial, fragile formation connected by the fuel and energy complex: "Russia as a powerful energy power is an ideological myth of the Russian unpromising. The very narrowing of economic progress to the "pipe" is an indicator of historical doom".

Upon his return, he continued active writing and public work: he edited the editions of his books, commented on political events, spoke at round tables and conferences, and gave interviews in various publications, from Zavtra to Komsomolskaya Pravda. In 2000, the publishing house "Centrpoligraf" published 5 volumes of collected works; director Viktor Vasilyev made the documentary film "I am a sovereign state", which was not released on the screens. In 2002, to the anniversary of Zinoviev, under the auspices of the Faculty of Philosophy of Moscow State University, the anthology "The Phenomenon of Zinoviev" was published. His latest novel was the "Russian Tragedy" (2002). Students began to gather around Zinoviev, and a seminar arose. At the suggestion of the rector of the Moscow University for the Humanities Igor Ilyinsky, the Alexander Zinoviev School was organized, where he taught a course of logical sociology, published on the Internet and published as a guide. The students created the site "Zinoviev.ru".

In recent years, Zinoviev was convinced that he was defending the side of the losers, and that Russia was doomed. He never joined any movement, although nationalists tried to draw him into their ranks. He kept radical rhetoric, giving account of the indifference and opportunism of the majority of the population; and attached importance to any protest and resistance, speaking, for example, in support of Eduard Limonov. He was carried away by the anti-scientific theory of Anatoly Fomenko, and wrote a preface to his book. The New Chronology was consonant with Zinoviev's thoughts about modern falsification of Soviet history, he was impressed by her boldness and originality. According to Maxim Kantor, the peculiar prophetic vanity led Zinoviev to extreme promiscuity. He wanted to be heard, and sought to use any tribune and audience, any means and allies, including Fomenko's "crazy theory". Maxim Kantor describes Zinoviev's contradictions in this way:

He fought to the end for the most important thing that makes life worthy – for freedom. And if he chose such a tool – probably there was also a strange logic. He knew: no one is around, he did not hope for anything. Here there is a cunning patriot, an oil smile spreads, some figures from the presidential administration flash, some parliamentarians are shaking hands. There are no others, there is nothing to hope for. But you have to fight. He was suddenly seized with enthusiasm: "I will publish the magazine "Points of Growth" – from here Russia will revive!". And then he gave up: what Russia? Those thieves?

Alexander Zinoviev died on 10 May 2006 from a brain tumor. According to Maxim Kantor, in the last conversation, he discussed the dehumanization of European culture, arguing that only the revival of humanism could save Russia. According to the testament, he was cremated, the ashes were scattered from a helicopter over the Chukhloma Region, where Zinoviev was born and grew up, a boulder was installed at this place. In memory of the merits before the Russian culture, a symbolic grave-cenotaph was erected at the Novodevichy Cemetery in Moscow. Posthumously, Zinoviev was awarded the title "Honorary Citizen of the Kostroma Region". In 2009, a monument to Zinoviev was erected in Kostroma, on the territory of Nikolai Nekrasov Kostroma State University (sculptor Andrey Kovalchuk). In 2016, on the eve of the 95th anniversary of Zinoviev, a new species of butterflies was named in his honor – "Zinoviev's Fan Wing" (Alucita zinovievi).

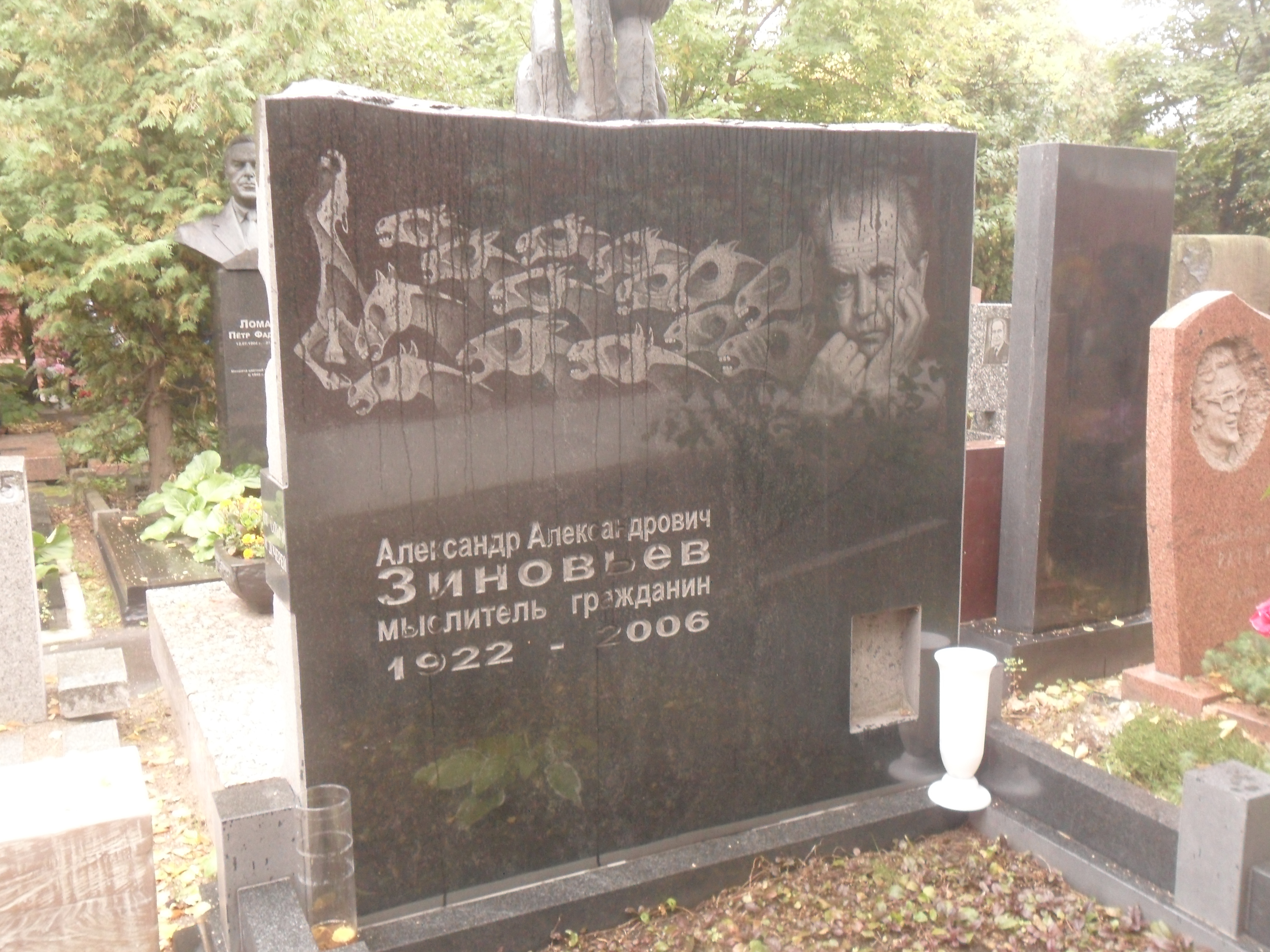
Grave-cenotaph of Zinoviev at Novodevichy Cemetery of Moscow

== Philosophical thought ==
The Newest Philosophical Dictionary identifies three periods in the work of Zinoviev. The first, "academic", period (1957–1977) – from the first publications of scientific works to the publication of "Yawning Heights" and expulsion from the Soviet Union: works on the logic and methodology of science. The second period (1978–1985) was the study, description and criticism of "real communism" in various genres: journalism, social satire and sociological essay. The third period, after the beginning of perestroika, was a period of critic of the collapse of the Soviet system and a critic of modern Western society. British scientists Michael Kirkwood noted the first period (1960–1972); the anti-communist period of "sociological novels" (1976–1986), the "Gorbachev-Yeltsin" gradual transition from anti-communism to criticism of the West (1986–1991), the post-Soviet period of analysis of modern Russia, criticism of the West and globalization (1991–2006).

=== Logics ===
In the 1950s, Zinoviev outlined the general principles of the "meaningful logic" program. Formally, being within the framework of the Soviet "dialectical logic", he limited the applicability of the analysis of Marx's "Capital" to a special kind of objects (historical or social), which are an "organic whole" with a complex functional structure. In his version, the dialectic turned out to be "a method for studying complex systems of empirical relationships". Substantive logic claimed the expression of both the linguistic aspect (formal logic) and logical-ontological, as well as procedural; considered thinking as a historical activity; affirmed the status of logic as an empirical science, the material of which are scientific texts, and the subject matter is the techniques of thinking; considered the instrumental function of logic for scientific thinking. In 1959, Zinoviev considered his concept contradictory, making a choice in favor of mathematical logic.

In the monograph "The Philosophical Problems of Multivalued Logic" (1960), Zinoviev reviewed almost all multivalued logical systems, analyzed the place, main results and applicability of multivalued logic in the logic and methodology of science. In subsequent works, he developed his own concept of logic, which he called "complex logic". The problem of logic, according to Zinoviev, was not in formal mathematical calculus, but in the development of "methods of reasoning, proof, methods of scientific knowledge". Zinoviev tried, firstly, to overcome the classical and intuitionistic versions of logic and, secondly, to expand the field of logic research based on the methodology of empirical sciences. The subject of logic is language, it does not discover, but invents specific rules of language — logical rules — and introduces them into language practices as artificial means of systematization. This prescriptivist approach is close to the late Wittgenstein. Zinoviev insisted on the universality of logic, claiming the independence of logical rules from the empirical areas of their application. He denied ontological status to such concepts as a point or zero, considering them tools of knowledge; his approach in Western literature was characterized as logical nominalism. Zinoviev's pupil, the German logician Horst Wessel, noted that his logic was based on syntax, not semantics.

Zinoviev investigated a number of questions of non-classical logic, from the general theory of signs to a logical analysis of motion, causality, space and time. In "The Philosophical Problems of Multivalued Logic", multivalued logic was viewed as a generalization, not an abolition of classical two-valued logic, although Zinoviev concluded that the emergence of multivalued logic "dealt a blow" to the a priori classical logic. Later, Zinoviev developed a general theory of succession (the theory of inference), which was significantly different from classical and intuitionistic mathematical logic. According to Wessel, its originality was the introduction of the two-place predicate "from... logically follows..." into the formula for logical following, in fact, metatermine. The theory of logical calculus and the remaining sections of logic (the theory of quantifiers and predication, the logic of classes, normative and epistemic logic) were built on the basis of the theory. The work "Complex Logic" (1970) presented a systematic consideration of the formal apparatus for analyzing concepts, statements and evidence; a strict quantifier theory was formulated in the monograph that corresponded to intuitive assumptions; the properties of quantifiers were investigated.

In a more popular form, his concept, including a discussion of the methodology of physics, was presented in the works "The Logic of Science" and "Logical Physics". Zinoviev, proceeding from the thesis about the universality of logic, criticized the point of view that a special or quantum logic is necessary for the microworld, different from the methodological formalism of the macroworld. In his opinion, many problems in the philosophy of physics or ontologies were terminological and were not related to physics proper, such as, for example, the problem of the reversibility of time. In Zinoviev's analysis, many of the statements traditionally understood as physical and empirical hypotheses were considered as implicit consequences of the definitions of terms; at least these statements can be presented without contradiction or empirical refutation. An example is the phrase "the physical body cannot be in different places at the same time".

=== Sociological novels ===
The main object in the books of Zinoviev is the Soviet world as a historical phenomenon, the phenomenon of Sovietness, described through the forbidden topics in the Soviet Union, primarily the taboo problem of social inequality. Zinoviev touched on topics such as drinking, sex, the lives of people with disabilities; the ideological language of the Soviet people; degerized history of the Soviet Union in terms of the experience of the inhabitants. Zinoviev's books showed the absurdity of the world of "real socialism", and described the state of minds of the Soviet intelligentsia of the late "stagnation" period: the characters constantly theorize, compare Soviet ideological myths and reality, try to get to the bottom of it and understand the nature of Soviet society. The characters criticize government policy and ridicule Soviet leaders, discuss economic problems, sympathize with dissidents and anti-Soviet terrorists, are interested in samizdat and Western radio stations, and have some sort of relationship with the State Security Committee. Prisons, camps and repression are placed on the periphery of social life. In contrast to the anti-Soviet dissident literature exposing the actions of individuals (Lenin, Stalin, etc.) or the "Party" or "bureaucracy" based on the dichotomy of "Power" and "People", Zinoviev describes society at the level of microsociology, his works echo with the "ironic sociological treatise" – the laws of Parkinson and Murphy.

There is a point of view that Zinoviev created a special genre: a "sociological novel". His books combined science and literature: methods, concepts, scientific statements were artistic techniques, and literary images were used as scientific tools. Different characters expressed the author's ideas, which allowed to consider society from different points of view and to reveal its complexity and paradox. Zinoviev called his work "synthetic literature" and "symphony". Zinoviev's genre was understood as a menippea in the terms of Mikhail Bakhtin (Peter Weil and Alexander Genis), a sociological treatise, even a textbook, an analog of the medieval "Sum of Knowledge" (Maxim Kantor), a parody of a scientific treatise (Dmitry Bykov). As Pavel Fokin believes, a sociological novel is closer to literature than to science, because it uses imagery. Michael Kirkwood considers Zinoviev's creativity to the literary criticism of the "letter" fashionable in the 1970s (Michel Foucault, Roland Barthes), as a never-ending process produced, according to Bart, as a "scriptor" and not "the author". Zinoviev's books were not limited to the conventional paradigm, but covered a wide range of literary, historical, political, sociological, aesthetic, moral, and religious issues.

Zinoviev's numerous works represent a holistic artistic universe with their own laws, ideology and poetics, forming one gigantic text or collection of texts with a single atomic structure that has no beginning and no end and repeats ad infinitum, therefore it can be read from any place. This structure corresponds to the author's vision of social reality. The idea of a complex, diverse and changeable social world, but subordinate to objective laws, is embodied in the compositional structure, the "sociological triangle" of three elements: personality, institution, and city. The tops of the triangle infinitely forked, united, intersected, revealing all sorts of social relations. Fragments (paragraphs or phrases) contain a complete statement that abstracts part of the social world. Texts, as a rule, consist of dialogues and reflections of representatives of different professions and social strata, cases of life, anecdotes, poems, etc. are often cited. The place of composition and plot is occupied by a kaleidoscope of various situations in which good and evil, sublime and low, heroism and meanness are indistinguishable. There are no descriptions of nature, setting, the story is centered around human relationships and actions. Anthropomorphic characters are used to describe social types, functions, or behaviors; social objects, connections and structures. The characters are missing characters and looks, names and surnames are replaced by nicknames denoting social roles (Thinker, Sociologist, Chatterbox, Slanderer, Screamer, Pretender, Brother, Zaiban, etc.). A frequent "character" is a theoretical text, usually in the form of a manuscript, discussed by the characters.

The texts of Zinoviev, on the one hand, are characterized by brevity, clarity, logic, completeness, humor, limited lexical means, the presence of headings and, on the other hand, represent a rather difficult and boring reading. Zinoviev did not attach much importance to artistic sophistication, his main books, especially "Yawning Heights" (in the words of Peter Weil and Alexander Genis, "an amorphous pile of pages"), were intended for Soviet readers and inevitably lost some of their meaning in the translation. The fragmentary manner of writing, breaking the narration into laconic phrases and short paragraphs bring Zinoviev closer to Vasily Rozanov, however Zinoviev's language is much more artless, he is deprived of Swift or Saltykov-Shchedrin's sophistication.

Zinoviev exposed and deconstructed the official language of Soviet slogans, a literate and normatively unified language, but filled with ideologemes and abstractions, creating illusory equality that deprived the individual of his freedom of choice. Its deconstruction is a prerequisite for recreating a genuine human language (Claude Schwab). The protest "anti-language" of Zinoviev resembles the folk Russian folklore, reflects the language of various social groups, primarily the intelligentsia, as well as the military, students, members of the party, members of informal communities. Zinoviev used pleonasms, puns, slang and obscene vocabulary, introduced neologisms: scientific words, portmanteau words, abbreviations. Maxim Kantor believes that the basis of Zinoviev's style was the language of folk tales, an unusual mixture of Mikhail Zoshchenko and Alexander Herzen. The rage of the Zinoviev language is aimed at a breakthrough to truth through lies and the hypocrisy of the established rules, by analogy with the miracle of "getting rid of the trouble" in a folk tale.

"Yawning Heights" show the city of Ibansk, "no one populated area", where the successful construction of "socism" is going on; all inhabitants wear the last name Ibanov. The city is dominated by absurdity, hypocrisy, cruelty, imperious arbitrariness, a sense of a dead end and hopelessness. In the endless Socratic dialogues, the heroes monotonously mock Soviet society and compose various sociological theories that lead nowhere. Most of the characters represent the intelligentsia of "liberal" views, they are not dissidents, but not capable of resisting conformists. Many pages expose Soviet official rhetoric, but hardly any authority or repressive organs are described. According to one of the points of view, "Yawning Heights" show science and scientific activity, which has turned into imitation, appearance, hypocrisy and tautology. Science is no longer capable of learning, but only describes itself. Scientists pretend to think, but do not produce anything, people depict the process of work, dissidents imitate resistance. The intelligentsia serves the regime or depicts a protest ("theater at Ibank").

"A Bright Future" describes the poverty, lies and spiritual emptiness of Soviet life on the example of the moral degradation of the sixties intellectual, a mediocre person who started his career in Stalin's time and achieved success during the "thaw". The novel "On the Eve of Paradise" is dedicated to various manifestations of dissidence generated by Soviet society and being part of it. "The Yellow House" continues the satire on the "progressive Soviet intelligentsia", exposes its duplicity, combining conformism with an orientation to the West; unwillingness to associate themselves with the people while preserving their instincts; meaningless parasitism on the texts of "bourgeois science". The main character, junior researcher, tries to preserve the individuality in the team, but becomes a renegade. As Claude Schwab summed up, the intelligentsia betrayed true spirituality: in scientific institutions they are not looking for truth, a lie is no longer even a lie, but a "pseudo-liqueur". Konstantin Krylov gives a characteristic quotation from Zinoviev's autobiography:

...from a moral point of view, the Soviet intelligentsia is the most cynical and despicable part of the population. They are better educated. Their mentality is extremely flexible, resourceful, adaptive. They know how to hide their nature, present their behavior in the best light and find excuses. The authorities, at least to some extent, are forced to think about the interests of the country. The intelligentsia think only of themselves. They are not a victim of the regime. They are the carrier of the regime.

"Homo Sovieticus" and "Para Bellum" affected the fate of the Soviet people in the West. "Homo Sovieticus" ridiculed intrigue, jealousy, the desire for power among immigrants who preserved Soviet habits of adaptation: Komsomol members quickly turn into supporters of Orthodoxy. In the novel, a Soviet person is defined – "Homo Sovieticus" or "Homosos": "Homosos is accustomed to live in relatively poor conditions, is ready to meet difficulties, constantly expects even worse, is conquered by the orders of the authorities... Homosos is a product of adaptation to certain social conditions".

=== Sociology ===
Zinoviev developed a theory of society based on his own research in the field of logic and the methodology of science, later calling his theory "logical sociology". Zinoviev often argued that logic interested him as a tool for studying society. Zinoviev's sociological theory can be divided into general and particular. The first relates to the whole world, the second to Soviet communism. The main method of knowledge of society is observation. From a methodological point of view, logical sociology as a rigorous scientific theory was based on two rules: first, the refusal to consider any propositions as a priori true; secondly, the need for a precise definition of the meaning of any term, which would eliminate ambiguity and vagueness. From the second rule, emphasized Zinoviev, followed the importance of constructing a consistent language, free from ideological borrowings. In the explication of terms from the set of objects, those that interest the researcher are highlighted, and a new understanding of the object is introduced; although traditional names can be used (society, government, state, etc.). A classic example is the term "communism", which Zinoviev used exclusively to describe the Soviet social system.

The key philosophical device (or method) of Zinoviev was a detailed logical analysis of the specific content extracted from the original abstract premise. Abstractions, such as communism or democracy, are not a generalized representation, but an incomplete, one-sided knowledge of the subject. Incomplete knowledge, as a rule, ideological, arises through the chaotic assimilation of ideas or images in which a person takes the connection between himself and the object (his own sensations or experiences) as properties of an object. The Zinoviev method allowed to deconstruct practically any general statements and was used in them primarily for the destruction of ideology, initially in the analysis of Soviet society, then the post-Soviet and Western ones.

The subject of social cognition is people as social individuals and their associations – "cheloveynik" (humant hill). According to Zinoviev, any large masses of people function in accordance with natural laws – "the laws of sociality" (social laws). These laws of existential egoism force the individual to act in order to preserve his social position, strengthen it as much as possible and take a higher position, having received maximum benefits with minimal costs. In accordance with social laws, any social association is divided into managers and subordinates, and social benefits are distributed according to the place of the subject in the power hierarchy. In contrast to the laws of biological individualism, the laws of sociality operate with greater sophistication and irreversibility, since people are able to learn the world and rationally organize their activities: existential laws turn into laws of rational calculation. Morality or law arise as constraints of social laws.

In the anthropology of Zinoviev, man is a "social animal", the mind is secondary to the social. Zinoviev considered the question of the primacy of society or the individual to be naive and outdated; in the modern world, man is a derivative of the social position, a set of social functions. Man is not necessarily evil by nature, but is associated with evil, he has both social and antisocial traits. This dialectic gives rise to the need for a power hierarchy, for domination and submission, in relations of domination and humiliation. A society without hierarchy and power is impossible. With the hypothetical disappearance of the state, many people would lose their main need – to enjoy the pleasure of causing violence to others – and would again build a system of power: society is a machine for maximizing dominance. Zinoviev adhered to the essence of the traditional model of power as a necessary evil, but, noted Konstantin Krylov, in an extremely original way reduced two elements of this definition, emphasizing their difference. Power arises from people's need for unity and generates social self-organization, which it subsequently appropriates. The government does not order anything and controls nothing, but, on the contrary, order arises as its restriction. Power is not effective, avoids responsibility, seeks to violence and destruction, to cause harm to the lower ones.

==== Communality and communism ====
In the early books, "The Yawning Heights" and "Communism as Reality", Zinoviev analyzed the Soviet social order, real communism; no other communism is possible. The main feature of the communist society was that social laws became specific patterns of its life activity. Zinoviev called them "communal relations" or "communality". The sphere of communality represents the social in its pure, refined form, in which social actions are aimed not at maximizing domination, but at minimizing humiliation:

The essence of communality lies in the struggle of people for existence and for improving their positions in the social environment, which they perceive as something given from nature, in many ways alien and hostile to them, at least as something that does not give its benefits to a person without effort and fight. The struggle of all against all forms the basis of people's lives in this aspect of history.

Communism was regarded by Zinoviev as a stable and durable creation. In "Communism as a Reality", the history movement was defined as a struggle between communism (communality) and civilization, which in the "Bright Future" was associated with the principle of individual resistance. According to Konstantin Krylov, the early Zinoviev saw two possible regulators limiting the "element of communality" – economy (economic competition) and spirituality. In real communism, both restrictions were lifted, and the natural tendency toward selfish behavior inherent in all societies and, ultimately, human nature, was realized. The Soviet social system did not flow out of national peculiarities and was not imposed from above, but, on the contrary, was an example of democracy by the people, assumed the complicity of the governed: "The Ibanian system of power is a product of the goodwill of the population" ("Yawning Heights"). Homo Sovieticus is "man as it is".

The naturalness or normality of communal relations is similar to the classical social thought – the ideas of Machiavelli, Bernard de Mandeville, Thomas Hobbes. If, for Hobbes or Hegel, the civil state (society) is limited by the natural state, the situation "man is wolf to man", then for Zinoviev the essence of the social is the triumph of communality, the principle "man is rat to man". "Communal rattle" is a jungle, a nightmare, evil. French commentator Vladimir Berelovich noted that this world is an exemplary anti-utopia, in which utopian paradise embodied in hell. The society is not separated from the natural state and is, in comparison with Orwell or Yevgeny Zamyatin's dystopias, more "mundane", resembling communities of animals or even insects. As Konstantin Krylov writes, Zinoviev, unlike many, allowed the theoretical possibility of building a society of material abundance, where human labor would be abolished. The answer to the question of what "real communism" would be was the story in "Yawning Heights" about rats who were given ideal conditions of existence. Rats, according to Zinoviev, would have created a concentration camp.

Communist society consists of basic elements – social "cells", their structure is the basis of society. As a primary work team of two or more people (for example, a school, hospital, factory, etc.). The cell, firstly, is related to the outside world as a whole; secondly, in it there is a division into a controlling organ ("brain") and controlled individuals ("body"); thirdly, managed individuals have different functions. Communal relations dominate inside the primary cell: in the informal life of the collective, there is a cynical struggle for recognition, and not for the improvement of social status, but in accordance with the basic principle: "be like everyone else!". Communal behavior in nature is hypocritical: lack of talent is exposed by talent, meanness by virtue, cowardly denunciation by courage and honesty, slander by truth. The suppression of the individual is not carried out by the authorities or the Committee for State Security, but in everyday life.

The domination of communality brings to the top of the social hierarchy of mediocrity and mediocrity ("false idols"), clinging to power and feeling natural in it (for example, Stalin), really talented people experience collective envy and hatred. Being a talented careerist means being exceptional mediocrity. Periodic ritual exile and punishment of external enemies ("renegades") in the course of mass harassment demonstrate the cohesion of social cells and reproduce the mechanisms of subordination, these collective actions relieve the psychological burden of individual responsibility. As Oleg Kharkhordin noted, tight control by higher authorities, as well as total transparency of the collective's internal life, mutual control and violence protect cells from degenerating into a mafia or gang, which would have happened if they were given freedom of self-organization.

Zinoviev considers the communist power in two planes: horizontal (social relations in the cellular structure) and vertical (hierarchy), the second is layered on the first. Power is reproduced "from below", at the level of the primary collective, where representation and democracy is exercised: people voluntarily join the Communist Party of the Soviet Union, members of the party are elected, they want to participate in power, the lower levels of the party influence the party top line. Despotic and informal power in social relations is literally everywhere. The cell structure leaves no room for law and politics: there are no parties or political competition, as well as political power. As Vladimir Berelovich wrote, Zinoviev consistently reduces the political to power, the power to the state apparatus, the apparatus to society. The state is not a political institution, but diluted socially, its only function is the reproduction of social relations. Since there are no social classes or interest groups in real communism, the ruling caste is not a social stratum or institution. The communist leadership is a "specific group" of several individuals. At the macro level, power turns into a dictatorship, but the supreme power is helpless in wanting to control everything.

Zinoviev's views on the history of real communism, Stalinism and the figure of Stalin are set forth in the novel "The Wings of Our Youth", other works and speeches. The events of 1917 were more like the collapse of the Russian Empire than a revolution, and, like the Civil War, were only a "foam of history". The deep-seated processes Zinoviev considered the emergence and maturation of a new society: institutional and bureaucratic changes, the growth and complication of the system of power, the formation of social cells, etc. The appearance of the figure of Stalin was inevitable and necessary. Stalin's leaderism had a national basis, Stalinism was a form of democracy: people of power (nominees) occupied power positions, people exercised power directly, using denunciations. The ruin of the village during the collectivization produced a social upheaval, millions of people from the lower classes gained access to education and culture. Repression resulted from the activities of the masses: the horror of Stalinism was not in the victims, but in the fact that the executioners, beginning with Stalin, best fit the social environment. Stalinism showed "the terrible essence of the centuries-old dream of mankind". The Stalin era was the era of the formation of real communism; Stalinism ended when a strong bureaucracy was formed. Khrushchev time was a period of unrest, under Brezhnev, communism reached a state of maturity.

==== Cheloveynik, Westernism and Super-Society ====
In the 1990s, Zinoviev turned to the study of Western society – "Westernism" and the modern tendencies of the social evolution of mankind. A systematic exposition of sociological theory is presented in the monographs "Towards a Super-Society" and "Logical Sociology". In the controversy with the Marxist and post-industrial approaches, Zinoviev, proceeding from the principle of anti-historicism, did not consider human associations in terms of their progressiveness – the level of development of science, technology, economics, etc., but depending on the type of social organization and their adequacy to the "human material". Human material is a combination of the character traits of a people, unevenly distributed among its individual representatives; type of social organization and specific human material are closely related.

To characterize complex human associations, Zinoviev introduced the notion of a cheloveynik (humant hill), clearly referring to an anthill. Zinoviev emphasized the role of biological evolution in the emergence of human associations and showed the direction of social evolution towards the maximum separation of functions, by analogy with collective insects. Cheloveyniks differ from animal communities only in the density of connections: there are many people, and they have to enter into close relationships. Cheloveyniks have a common historical life for generations; act as one; have a complex and functional device; own a certain territory; have internal autonomy, internal and external identification. The evolution of the cheloveynik includes three stages: pre-society – primitive or generic societies; society – the union of people, historically formed as a whole; global super-society consisting of heterogeneous human material. Cheloveyniks differ in the type of social time, which is capable of expansion, compression, can go backwards; in other words, they can be owned. The pre-society lives in an eternal social present, society is able to own the past, and the super-society controls its future, a narrow group of people will be engaged in this design.

At the stage of society, separate areas of life activity arise, three aspects of the relationship between social individuals. The business aspect refers to the activities of people in the production of livelihoods, the creation of material culture. The communal aspect affects any actions related to the presence of large masses of people, and affects the relationship of power and position in the social hierarchy. The mental aspect includes the sphere of consciousness or mentality and is considered from the point of view of its influence on values and behavior, beyond the criteria of truth and falsity. In the late Zinoviev, the economic sphere and mentality were no longer limiters of communality. In various societies, one or another aspect prevails, which leads to their features and patterns of development. Capitalist societies have grown out of the business aspect as economic societies. Soviet society arose on the basis of communal relations and became a communist society.

In the twentieth century, the historical epoch of the existence of separate societies as national states ends, after the Second World War, with the complication of social organization, the transition to super-society takes place. Within the framework of Western European civilization, which possessed a unique ability to qualitatively change itself, two evolutionary branches emerged that fought for the role of leaders of the world evolutionary process: cheloveyniks of the communist type (Soviet Union) and westernist cheloveyniks (United States and Western Europe). Westernism, inhabited by "westernoids", is a unique form of social organization that originated in Europe and spread to North America, part of Asia and Australia. Capitalism and democracy are natural and effective only for westernoids as a specific human material, for other peoples they are destructive. The primary social cells ("business cells") of the West are totalitarian, based on rigid discipline. Westernism is evolving from democracy and capitalism (historically finite phenomena) towards communism and communality, "post-democracy".

The West seeks global hegemony, globalization, Westernization and Americanization are one and the same: a new form of Western colonialism. Forms of social organization, government and mentality are imposed on non-Western societies, in particular, through illusory ideas about the possibilities of having Western abundance. Westernization is not the malice of the ruling circles, but follows from objective social laws. According to the British commentator Philip Hanson, the assessment of the geographical distribution of Westernism has a clear resemblance to the work of the English economist Angus Maddison; the criticism of globalization and the American imperial project echoes the views of Noam Chomsky and Niall Ferguson and the moderate positions of Eric Hobsbawm.

The Soviet Union was historically the first super-society, but as a result of the victory of the West in the Cold War and the defeat of communism, the second line of evolution prevailed. The domination of a super-society, a single, global cheloveynik was established as the domination of Westernism: other peoples and states are doomed to remain subordinate to the West on the periphery. The illegitimate and non-electoral superpower is being built over previously existing areas, creating a super-state and super-economy. Hierarchical power networks of the superstate are engaged in strategic management, controlling finances, media, parties, etc.; in money totalitarianism of the super-economy, money turns from capital into a means of power. In early history, there were many pre-societies, in the recent past – fewer societies; after the defeat of Soviet communism, the world forever became one (although the distant future remains uncertain). Autonomous evolution of cheloveyniks is no longer possible, the global super-society eliminates or absorbs them. Civilization of Western Europe will eventually disappear too.

==== Death of communism and post-Sovietism ====
In the 1990s, Zinoviev shifted research accents and changed assessments regarding Soviet communism, which, commentators noted, was not a radical change of opinion: he had previously written about the merits of the Soviet system and never rejected communism, considering it a working system. Zinoviev softened his attitude towards Soviet society and adjusted the estimates of the future. Communism was a young and viable social system, effective in a social sense, and not economically. It arranged for most ordinary people who earned little, but also worked a little. Communism allowed to meet basic needs, eliminated unemployment and, at least in the early period, was directed to the future.

The collapse of Soviet communism was considered a tragedy by Zinoviev. Initially, he believed that restructuring was the wrong answer to the managerial crisis that began as an ideological one. The crisis could have been resolved by Soviet methods, but the leaders of the Soviet Union took it for the crisis of the Soviet system. Therefore, the Restructuring inevitably had to lead to its death. Later, he believed that the main reasons for the collapse of communism were not internal contradictions, but the intervention of Western forces with the help of traitors and collaborators of the fifth column, primarily the Soviet and Russian authorities. Communism was finally destroyed between 1991 and 1993. The West may use some of the merits of communism, but, according to Zinoviev, the fate of the vanquished is obvious: after winning the Cold War, the West will not only destroy Russia, but also erase its memory from history ("The Global Humant Hill"). The collapse of communism was dangerous for two reasons: first, the communist system was most suitable for Russia due to the peculiarities of the Russian human material; secondly, the defeat of communism cut off the evolutionary branch opposed to Westernism: from now on, humanity will have no alternative organized into a rigid hierarchical structure. At the same time, Abdusalam Huseynov noted, for Zinoviev, the victory of communism in the Cold War and its worldwide expansion would lead to a much worse scenario.

The system of post-Soviet Russia Zinoviev considered as a secondary social creation. If Soviet communism was a normal (full-fledged) type of social organization, then "post-Sovietism" – "horned rabbit" – was a particularly "vile" and "disgusting" type of social hybrid from the worst features of Soviet communism, Westernism and fundamentalism in pre-revolutionary Russia. Zinoviev did not consider the reforms of the 1990s the building of a market economy or Western democracy. Reforms, on the contrary, collapsed the economy, destroying the basis of everyday life – labor collectives; there was only the conversion of informal asset management into formal property. The western component of post-Sovietism is incompatible with human material, natural conditions and historical traditions of Russia; Western democracy is imitated, but not implemented. The economy has lost sovereignty, because the West is interested in the destruction of Russia. Post-Sovietism has no vision of the future – even the Communist Party of the Russian Federation has abandoned communist ideas, and Orthodox fundamentalism has taken the place of ideology.

=== Ideology and history. "Understanding Factor" ===
Zinoviev considered ideology to be a "virus" dangerous for society. Ideology forms a person's world outlook about himself, about the conditions of his existence, about society and the outside world. It determines various social roles or masks, makes a person play a social game, depriving him of critical thinking; ideology serves power. Ideology is the antithesis of logical and scientific thinking, but humanity cannot do without ideology, it is an irremovable element of large human associations. Soviet society Zinoviev considered the first fully subordinate ideology. It was contained not only in the official doctrine, but primarily in daily activities, turning people into active, active participants in ideological performances (Michael Kirkwood). Belief in ideology is not required, it is accepted on the basis of rational calculation (Claude Schwab). Ideology reduces a person to a function, social morality turns into a pseudo-moral or false moral, in a completely conformist communist society there is no trust. In Yawning Heights, most of society is made up of hypocrites, cynics, and lackeys, out of which emerges a "new person" constructed by ideology, a "normal individual", deprived of all human (conscience, individuality, etc.).

The ideological consciousness of man is for Zinoviev beyond the bounds of an unreliable historical experience, since "there are only illusions of historical explanation" ("Communism as a Reality"). Hence the extra-historical approach and the lack of chronology in his works. As Maxim Kantor writes, all events, "both Marx, and Ibansk, and "catastroika", and utopia, and the Master (Stalin), and Westernism", occur simultaneously in the consciousness of the individual. For Zinoviev, history is a history of disintegration, both personal and social, the history of dehumanization in the name of progress. Ibansk – a completely dehumanized society, in which there is no linear time; "the story ran aground", turned into an absurdity. People are sentenced to the eternal present, waiting for the end, without hope, for hope refers to an open story. The characters of "Yawning Heights" do not even try to leave a mark on history, because they realize that the past can always be rewritten.

For early Zinoviev, sociology prevailed over history, he explored communism as a given, considering capitalism and communism in sync, as different structural variants of the existence of society. Later, Zinoviev expanded his concept to the West: Communism and Westernism represent the varieties of the mass society of the 20th century, marking the end of human history. The personality of a person is completely dependent on social position and ideology. The world is moving towards simplification; Evgeny Ponomarev believes that Zinoviev comes close to his views on the history of Konstantin Leontyev. The next stage of personal degradation is the emergence of a computer, which takes away from a person his functions and suppresses an excess of information. Civilization turns into imitation – one big computer, endlessly processing the same data. The future society of a "global cheloveynik" is reminiscent of Soviet communism: a person is impersonal, turns into a function, a half-robot, human relations are replaced by virtual ones in conditions of total distortion of information and the domination of ideology.

True responsibility of a person towards himself, the world and other people is possible only with the liberation of consciousness from any form of ideology, which is not easy to do: people are afraid and avoid the truth, do not want to know the truth about themselves ("Yawning Heights"). As Maxim Kantor believes, the thinker defended an absolute understanding of human existence, "understood to understand" (the position of the Hegelian). Zinoviev believed in the power of reason, as well as in the power of man, in the fact that the scientific understanding of society can change it. A person must constantly think, see the real state of things, not be satisfied with illusions, understand why he acts in society in a certain way. In the later period, Zinoviev considered the main problem of our time is the unwillingness and inability of people to understand society, its changes and their own place in social evolution. For objective understanding, extra-scientific conditions are also necessary: on the one hand, a certain ethical position is the rejection of dominant values, attitudes and social rules; on the other hand, the value aspect is the formation of a social ideal. In recent works, Zinoviev considered the communist utopia to be such an ideal.

Michael Kirkwood quoted Zinoviev as saying, believing that it explains the inconsistency of his thought:

I can express and justify one judgment in one situation, and in another – something opposite to it. This is not unprincipled. It is the desire to look at the matter from another point of view, to consider another aspect of the problem. Sometimes – just out of the spirit of controversy. The fact is that I am not a doctrinaire, not a prophet, not a politician, not a decent professor. I live in the language, as in a special reality, and in reality – a complex, contradictory, fluid. Here every dogmatism is destructive. There are no once and for all established formulas. Sustained in my position is one thing: strive for truth and resist violence, because without it you are not a person.

=== Ethics ===
Zinoviev's ethics was a response to the social laws of existential egoism, in which there is neither morality nor freedom. Ethics complements the pessimistic sociology, which, by its own admission, Zinoviev developed to create a "teaching about life" and find a place in society for himself as an "ideal communist". In "Yawning Heights", Zinoviev wrote: "The point is not to discover the truth about yourself. There is no need for a lot of mind. The point is how to live after that". The machinery of society is subject to cruel and inhuman laws, inevitable, like the laws of nature; but a separate individual can overcome them, build his life as a "paradise" in a social "hell". Zinoviev often quoted phrase: "When people want to spit on the laws of gravity, they build airplanes". The quintessence of Zinoviev's ethics is contained in the phrase: "I am a sovereign state"; he argued that he adhered to this principle all his life, even making his own constitution. As Abdusalam Huseynov noted, Zinoviev developed an ethical teaching exclusively for himself. The system of Zinoviev's views, which he called the "Zinovyoga", echoes the tradition that goes from the Stoics to Kant. General provisions were developed in the early 1960s and set forth, in particular, in the "Gospel for Ivan", "Go to Golgotha" and "Live".

Zinoviev's ethics has the following features: simplicity and unconditionality (Kant and Albert Schweitzer), despite the fragility, weakness and complexity of its implementation; Responsibility (Antoine de Saint-Exupéry), ethics are based on responsible individual judgment. A person faces a choice: to participate in the egoistic struggle for social benefits or to evade it, but remain in society. Personal decision in specific situations voluntarily limits the laws of sociality and, therefore, is truly moral or ethical. Should a man be conformist? Should he risk going against the tide? If so, in the name of what? What will happen to him if he violates social laws? An ethical act in itself is not moral or immoral, it is necessary to be guided by its own values and values, and not by general ideas. Man is the criterion for the determination of good and evil, which does not mean the absence of commandments or models. On the contrary, there are many different rules and regulations, following which a person from a social individual becomes a person, using the ethical experience of humanity. The main rule – the rejection of actions aimed at own benefit, if it harms another.

Ethics of resistance is based on paradox: Zinoviev as the scientist proceeded from the inexorable course of social evolution and social determinism, but he believed that in the struggle for freedom, a person must act, fight, resist, so that there is hope, although it does not exist. The worse the situation, the more reasons for resistance, and the struggle is possible only in solitude, which, like death, is the price for a truly ethical act. Through loneliness, a person enters an invisible community of those who have chosen resistance into the "eternal fraternity of the lonely" (the fate of the Talker in "Yawning Heights").

== Heritage. Perception. Criticism ==
=== Logical heritage ===
Zinoviev played an important role in the development of national logic in the 1950–1960s. His early program of "substantive logic" did not receive official recognition, but influenced the development of Soviet research on the methodology of science. In the 1960s, Zinoviev was one of the leading Soviet logicians, the leader of the "cognitive movement", which, according to Vladislav Lektorsky, fascinated many philosophers, logicians, mathematicians, psychologists and linguists. Five works by Zinoviev were published in the West, which was a unique case for Russian philosophical thought. The monograph "The Philosophical Problems of Multivalued Logic" (1960), soon translated into English, was a significant event in Soviet philosophy, although it had flaws. Classical work became one of the world's first monographs on multi-valued logic and the first in the Soviet bloc. In general, the work of Zinoviev corresponded to the level of scientific achievements in the field of non-classical logic of the time, highly valued by such logicians as Kazimir Aydukevich, Jozef Bohensky, Georg von Wright, but did not attract much attention in the West. Zinoviev gave priority to formal methods over formal calculi, which alienated his work from the main directions and trends of the logic and methodology of science of the second half of the 20th century. Negatively, the fate of the logical heritage of Zinoviev was influenced by extra-scientific reasons: the collapse of his school after forced emigration, the ban in the Soviet Union of references to his work. As a result, in the domestic literature there is no systematic presentation of the corpus of logical works of the scientist.

=== Perception in the West ===
Zinoviev gained fame primarily as the author of "Yawning Heights", a dissident writer, becoming probably the most famous representative of the third wave emigration after Alexander Solzhenitsyn. His "sociological novels" were generally popular, attracted the attention of critics and the press, were translated into various languages. According to Pavel Fokin, a critical bibliography of Zinoviev in Europe contains several hundred articles and reviews, a number of monographs. The experimental novelty of his poetics was quite understandable to the Western reader, taking into account the development of literature in the 20th century. His prose was highly praised, for example, by Anthony Burgess and Eugène Ionesco, who considered Zinoviev to be perhaps the largest contemporary writer. Subsequent works were perceived as weaker compared to the "infinite rage" of the "Yawning Heights" or the "directness" of the "Bright Future". Emigrant criticism, positively assessing the first two books, later ignored his works, not least because of the satire on dissidents.

Zinoviev gained the greatest popularity in France, where the "Yawning Heights" temporarily destroyed the image of the Soviet Union, created by Solzhenitsyn's book "The Gulag Archipelago". In contrast to the generally accepted Western ideas about the "evil empire", shared by Solzhenitsyn and the third wave of immigrants, Zinoviev gave the Soviet system a kind of existential value. In the émigré environment, the opinion that the understanding of the Soviet Union by Zinoviev should be taken seriously was quite common. Estimates of Zinoviev as sociologist in the West are ambiguous. His works were considered as the first attempt of the Soviet philosopher to propose a critique of Soviet institutions independent of official dogma and a holistic concept of the Soviet system, presented in its original form. In the 1980s, his books attracted the attention of a number of historians and social scientists, changing their perception of Soviet society, and "lured" some Slavists. Sovietologists perceived "Communism as a Reality" with respect, but criticized some of the key statements. Outside of Sovietology, the ideas of Zinoviev influenced the political researchers of Ronald of Tyr, and especially of Jon Elster, who believed that the Ibanian model of "ineffectiveness" allows one to comprehend political irrationality. Interest in Zinoviev expressed in the collective collection "Alexander Zinoviev: a Writer and Thinker" (1988). In 1992, Michael Kirkwood's monograph "Alexander Zinoviev: An Introduction to His Work" was published.

In general, the impact of Zinoviev on Sovietology was insignificant. The Western establishment was indifferent to Zinoviev, his works were considered as a subject of study, and not as part of intellectual dialogue. According to Konstantin Krylov, numerous European awards and titles of "honorary citizen of Orange and Ravenna" represented rather "tinsel". Outside of France and Italy, especially in English-speaking countries, the perception of Zinoviev's ideas as a social theorist was much cooler. Commentators Philip Hanson and Michael Kirkwood noted that the format of the interview, in which Zinoviev usually spoke, simplified and exaggerated his ideas, exacerbating the negative attitude in the English-speaking world. Zinoviev's harsh public statements even before perestroika contributed to his "semi-quarantine" in the academic environment. Oleg Kharkhordin summarized the reasons for the non-acceptance of Zinoviev's sociological works in the West: first, his sociological essays did not meet the scientific standards of positivistic research, although Zinoviev insisted on the opposite; secondly, he later accused the West of a conspiracy to destroy the Soviet Union, which was regarded as a gross political blunder. Zinoviev himself argued that Sovietologists were engaged because they pursued not scientific, but political goals: to find weaknesses, weaknesses and vulnerabilities in Communism in order to "kill the beast".

According to Western critics, the claims to create an "absolute" social science, to a "truly scientific" description of society, in particular Soviet society, and to discover absolute and mathematically precise social laws have become outdated. Zinoviev was the heir of 19th century scientism and Soviet scientism and was not familiar with the achievements of the classics of Western sociology. The naive desire to learn society as a "reality" with the help of the method excluding interpretations reflected the influence of Hegel and Marxism (ideas about the real and reasonable identities) and did not withstand the criteria of Kant established for scientific knowledge (distinction between phenomenon and noumenon). As a result, the objective social laws with which Zinoviev replaced the Marxist laws of historical development were placed by him as natural laws into reality, which corresponded to the ideology of Marxism–Leninism.

Critics noted the contradiction between the declared scientific impartiality of Zinoviev, his sociological determinism and obvious moralism, belief in free will and ethical imperatives. It was concluded that he was not a scientist, but rather a moralist or a writer. His social determinism and idolatry before sociology excluded the possibility of free action or resistance. Hence the critical attitude of Zinoviev to dissidents, to their position of "personal feat". Zinoviev was accused of apologizing for Stalin and justifying collectivization under the guise of objectivity. He was blamed for anti–historicism and certain views that included ideas obsolete in social thought: the naturalistic vision of society, similar to the concept of Herbert Spencer; ideas about the inevitable social evolution (Marxism), its passage through certain stages; a mixture of archaic, Marxist and modern political concepts. Vladimir Berelovich concluded that the sociological concept of Zinoviev should be viewed not as a theory of Soviet society, but rather as a manifestation of the "mental universe" underlying the Soviet regime and its ideology. According to Georges Niva,

Prisoner of his nightmare, isolated in his unprovable omniscience, blinded by the image of the impenetrable human bestiary, Zinoviev, without a doubt, is one of the most vivid examples of imprisonment of a person in a totalitarian system.

The "scientific forecast" of Zinoviev about the stability of Soviet communism as a social system incapable of reform was not justified. From the point of view of Western researchers, he was refuted by historical events: Perestroika, the collapse of the Soviet Union. Claude Lefort in 1989 summarized:

I immediately felt in Zinoviev an intellectual who is prone to paradoxes, who seeks to refute all established opinions and considers himself able to show that this fragmented, atomized society ultimately wants only to maintain a system that guarantees the advantages of inertness and corruption. I have never agreed with his interpretation. Events deny it.

According to Philip Hanson, the turn of the late Zinoviev to criticism of the West resembles the evolution of Herzen and Solzhenitsyn, who, like Nikolai Berdyaev, retained a deep affection for Russia. Unlike Berdyaev and Solzhenitsyn, Zinoviev was guided by communism, rationality and society. The thinker evolved from Westernism to Slavophilism (Michael Kirkwood) or to "Soviet patriotism" (Philip Hanson), social, rather than ethnic nationalism (Zinoviev laughed at particular "Russian spirituality"). Zinoviev's post-communist opus, Hanson believes, simplifiedly generalized the non-Western world and exaggerated the invulnerability of the West; the commentator doubted that the Soviet Union was a super-society. At the same time, the results of sociological surveys about the attitude of Russians towards the collapse of the Soviet Union and the social changes that have taken place largely confirm his vision. According to Hanson, Zinoviev's large-scale historical scheme clearly expressed and partly anticipated the public mindset in modern Russia, especially the views of the ruling elite of the Putin era: a feeling of humiliation, anti-Americanism and regret about the collapse of the Soviet Union. Although Zinoviev did not have time for the Russian leaders, he thought in a similar way that they too were, but more clearly.

=== Perception in Russia ===
Alexander Zinoviev belonged to those Soviet philosophers who opposed dogma in science and humanitarian thought in the 1950s and 1960s, their heated debates influenced public attitudes, shaped the views and beliefs of the Soviet intelligentsia. His sociological novels, which were circulated in samizdat during the late "stagnation" period, contributed to the collapse of official ideology, which had already pretty weakened after strikes by dissidents and Solzhenitsyn. Zinoviev's books were written on the topic of the day, they reflected one or another public mindset, therefore in the 1980s their readers were "westerners", in the 1990s they were "soilers". His works began to be published quite late, after the books of Andrei Platonov and Vladimir Nabokov, but before Solzhenitsyn. "Yawning Heights" sold out in a rather large circulation, "Communism as a Reality" in 1994 did not arouse much reader interest. The difficulty of Zinoviev's language was not noticed by readers of samizdat; more important was the fact of reading forbidden literature; only later did complex style contribute to the disappearance of interest. According to Konstantin Krylov, by the 21st century, Zinoviev's anti-Soviet books "fell into the same cesspool as all anti-Soviet literature", with the active participation of their former readers – representatives of the "liberal" intelligentsia.

In the 1990s, there was almost no discussion of Zinoviev's work in the intellectual environment, which he himself contributed to with his sometimes rash and not always thought-out statements. According to Konstantin Krylov, Russian intellectuals, as a rule, spoke of him with "simplicity of fastidiousness", considered him to be "Ivan who does not know how to flicker foppishly, does not quote Foucault and Marcuse" and whose "glamorous" constructions are not suitable for "discourse". Representatives of the "liberal" intelligentsia condemned Zinoviev for his primitive literary form, his betrayal of liberalism, and his fierce defense of communism. At the same time, his conspiracy theories about Western "puppeteers" were readily accepted by the "soilers". According to Vladislav Lektersky, the sociological concept of Zinoviev, with rare exceptions, was not comprehended by Russian academic sociology and philosophy, although the image of homo sovieticus was used in sociological research by Yuri Levada and his followers. Later works by Zinoviev influenced, in particular, the sociologist Andrei Fursov and the political philosopher Vadim Tsymbursky. In the 21st century, a certain interest arose in the legacy of Zinoviev. With the efforts of Olga Zinovieva, "The Understanding Factor" was posthumously published as his final work. The thinker was devoted to the volume from the series "Russian Philosophy of the Second Half of the 20th Century" (2009), a collection of memoirs "Alexander Alexandrovich Zinoviev: the Experience of a Collective Portrait" (2012). The first philological candidate dissertation was defended in 2013. In 2016, in the series "The Life of Wonderful People", a biography of Zinoviev was written by literary historian Pavel Fokin.

Zinoviev is considered as an independent Russian thinker, who combined philosophy, logic, sociology, ethics, literature in a holistic worldview. A number of commentators believe that Zinoviev thought not in the form of rigorous systematic knowledge, not with the help of scientific concepts, but through images, metaphors, allegories, deliberately eliminating the separation between philosophy and literature to best describe reality. His works, especially of the late period, are often characterized as philosophical or sociological journalism. The philosopher Vadim Mezhuyev noted the extreme complexity and contradictory views of Zinoviev, the amplitude of his paradoxical thought. Having written, perhaps, "the worst satire on the Soviet system", he then called the Soviet period the best in the history of Russia, the best that Russia was able to create. The figure of Zinoviev is tragic, he was distinguished by pessimism and, probably, an extremely "tragic view of history". With good reason, he rejected Western society ("Westernism"), but he perceived Russia ambiguously, combining love for Russia with a desire to understand it scientifically. However, Zinoviev was not an apologist for real communism and did not at all consider him an ideal. Finally, his vision of the world was deeply personal, created "out of himself" – many of his books did not contain footnotes. Therefore, Mezhuev concludes, it is difficult for Zinoviev to compare with someone, to understand to whom he inherited, including in Russian thought.

According to Maxim Kantor, Zinoviev became a writer "out of shame for human nature" and created a multi-volume "history of the Russian state" in the form of a folk epos, covering the period from Khrushchev to Yeltsin; the history of the people's tragedy – dehumanization and degradation of social and human dignity, the history of the collapse and series of disasters, however, told as one endless joke. The chronicle of the era of disintegration was a "study of research", through double exclusion described the ideological factory of society – philosophers, sociologists, nomenclature. According to Kantor, Zinoviev's fairy-tale epic from book to book became increasingly banal, unfunny, flat and boring: later works on the West did not reach the level of "Yawning Heights". Bold, but scientifically naive and unreliable books about the West were actually written by the author about Russia; the real West was never of interest to Zinoviev. The image of the West was one of the metaphors of Russian life – Zinoviev followed Russian emigrant thought, starting with Herzen.

According to Russian sociologist Nina Naumova, "Yawning Heights" were the only attempt in Soviet sociology to propose a description of the Soviet system. Russian-American philosopher and sociologist Oleg Kharkhordin considered "Communism as Reality" the best introduction to the sociology of Soviet life, noting the exceptional "clarity and power" of Zinoviev's conceptualization of informal activity. Kharkhordin saw the proximity of his model to the analysis of traditionalist communities by Pierre Bourdieu and found advantages in the Zinoviev model. Andrei Fursov brings Zinoviev's work closer to the "new social history" that arose in the 1970s based on the ideas of Edward Thompson, Michel Foucault, and others. This direction considers history not from the point of view of elites, but from the side of the oppressed. Therefore, Zinoviev, according to Fursov, was at the forefront of world social thought; "Zinoviev's system" offers a promising answer to the question of the possibility of social knowledge that overcomes the limited views of the ruling and oppressed groups (ideology and utopia). Abdusalam Huseynov believed that the realized Zinoviev's forecast of "Catastroika" undoubtedly proves his concept of Soviet communism.

Philosopher Boris Mezhuyev drew attention to the fact that Zinoviev, at the end of his anti-communism, criticized Gorbachev from left-wing, radical positions, considering the perestroika a provocation of special services ("Gorbachevism"). Only in 1989 did Zinoviev take up the position of archiconservatism, subsequently making every effort so that his early views would be forgotten. Mezhuyev did not doubt the sincerity of the convictions of the "outstanding thinker", but noted that even the "best people of Russia" manifest radicalism, infantilism, hatred of moderation, nonviolence, harmony and compromise, characteristic of the Russian mentality. According to another point of view (Andrei Fursov), Zinoviev's uncompromising and polemic position was based on "truth – the truth of the people, history, generation", which in the Russian tradition brought the thinker closer to Avvakum. If Fursov called Zinoviev a "great contrarian", then Maxim Kantor believed that the thinker was a "great affirmator" who dreamed of the epic of utopia, overcoming tradition, about a holistic, free from the lie of human being. According to Konstantin Krylov, Zinoviev perceived himself as a lone "fighter" acting according to the situation and considering his activities to be useful service to the society rejected by him. Zinoviev was characterized by Dmitry Bykov as a person with a "clinical complete lack of fear", a conflicting egocentric and nonconformist. From the point of view of Maxim Cantor,

Zinoviev was a dissident twice: he opposed the socialist system, then – against what came to replace it. He criticized Russia, then the West... [Zinoviev] fought not with socialism – but with social evil, not for Western civilization – but for humanism, not for progress – but for truth. More precisely: he defended concrete humanism – and this at the time when abstract humanism became the public password. Zinoviev abhorred abstraction: if you want to do good – come on, do it now... Zinoviev will take a place in history next to Chaadaev, Herzen, Chernyshevsky. He posed questions of their magnitude, suffered the same pain.

== See also ==
- Vadim Tsymburskiy

== Honours ==
(other than Soviet scientific degrees and War medals)

- member of Finnish Academy of Science, 1974
- member of Italian Academy of Science, 1978
- member of Bavarian Academy of Arts, 1984
- Prix Europeén de l'essai laureate, 1977
- award Best European Novel, 1978
- Prix Médicis Étranger laureate, 1978
- Prix Alexis de Tocqueville laureate, 1982
- honorary citizen of Ravenna, Avignon, Orange and Kostroma

== Bibliography ==
=== Scientific works ===
- The Philosophical Problems of the Polyvalential Logic (Философские проблемы многозначной логики, 1960)
- Логика высказываний и теория вывода (1962)
- The Principles of the Scientific Theory of Scientific Knowledge (Основы научной теории научных знаний, 1967)
- Complex Logics (Комплексная логика, 1970)
- The Logics of Science (Логика науки, 1972)
- Logical Physics (Логическая физика, 1972)

=== Fiction and sociological works ===
- The Yawning Heights (Зияющие высоты) 1976
- The Radiant Future (Светлое будущее) 1978
- On the Threshold of Paradise (В преддверии рая) 1979
- Without Illusions (Без иллюзий) 1979
- Notes of the Nightwatchman (Записки ночного сторожа) 1979
- Communism as a Reality (Коммунизм как реальность) 1980
- The Yellow House (Желтый дом) 1980
- We and the West (Мы и Запад) 1981
- Homo Soveticus (Гомо советикус) (1982) ISBN 0-87113-080-7
- No Liberty, No Equality, No Fraternity (Ни свободы, ни равенства, ни братства) 1983
- Non-standard logic and its applications:(several lectures in Oxford) 1983
- Para Bellum (Пара беллум) 1982
- My Home my Exile (Мой дом – моя чужбина) 1982
- The Wings of Our Youth (Нашей юности полёт) 1983
- Gospels for Ivan (Евангелие для Ивана) 1982
- Go to Golgatha (Иди на Голгофу) 1985
- Gorbachevism (Горбачевизм) 1988
- Catastroika (Катастройка) 1988
- Live! (Живи) 1989
- My Chekhov (Мой Чехов) 1989
- The Embroilment (Смута, 1994)
- The Russian Experiment (Русский эксперимент) 1994
- The West: phenomenon of westernism (Запад: феномен западнизма) 1995
- The Post-Communist Russia (Посткоммунистическая Россия) 1996
- The Global Humant Hill (Глобальный человейник) 1997
- The Russian Fate (Русская судьба) 1999
- The Global suprasociety and Russia Alexander Zinoviev(Глобальное сверхобщество и Запад) 2000
- The Endeavour (Затея) 2000
- The Demise of Russian communism (Гибель русского коммунизма) 2001
- The logical sociologe (Логическая социология) 2003
- The West (Запад) 2003
- The Russian tragedy: the Death of a Utopia (Русская трагедия: гибель утопии) 2002
- The Ideology of the Party of the Future (Идеология партии будущего) 2003
- Suprasociety ahead (На пути к сверхобществу) 2004
- The logical intellect (Логический интеллект) 2005
- The crossroads (Распутье) 2005
- The confession of a dissident (Исповедь отщепенца) 2005
- The factor of cognizance (Фактор понимания) 2006

=== About Zinoviev ===
- Alexander Zinoviev as Writer and Thinker: An Assessment by Philip Hanson; Michael Kirkwood
  - Reviewed in Slavic Review Vol. 48, No. 4 (Winter, 1989), pp. 694–695 by Alex de Jonge and in Russian Review Vol. 49, No. 4 (Oct., 1990), pp. 490–492 by Catharine Theimer Nepomnyashchy
- Alexander Zinoviev on Stalinism: Some Observations on "The Flight of Our Youth". By Philip Hanson in Soviet Studies Vol. 40, No. 1 (Jan., 1988), pp. 125–135
