= Ana Pouvreau =

Ana Pouvreau is a French political scientist, writer and specialist in International Relations and Strategic studies. Originally a Russia specialist for 20 years, she has become a Turkish affairs specialist. and has worked on other geopolitical areas such as the Balkans. She is also an expert on the politics, defence and security issues of France. In recent years, she has been investigating societal issues which she considers critical to the survival of Western civilization. She is the author of several books and has also written for Newsweek and other publications.

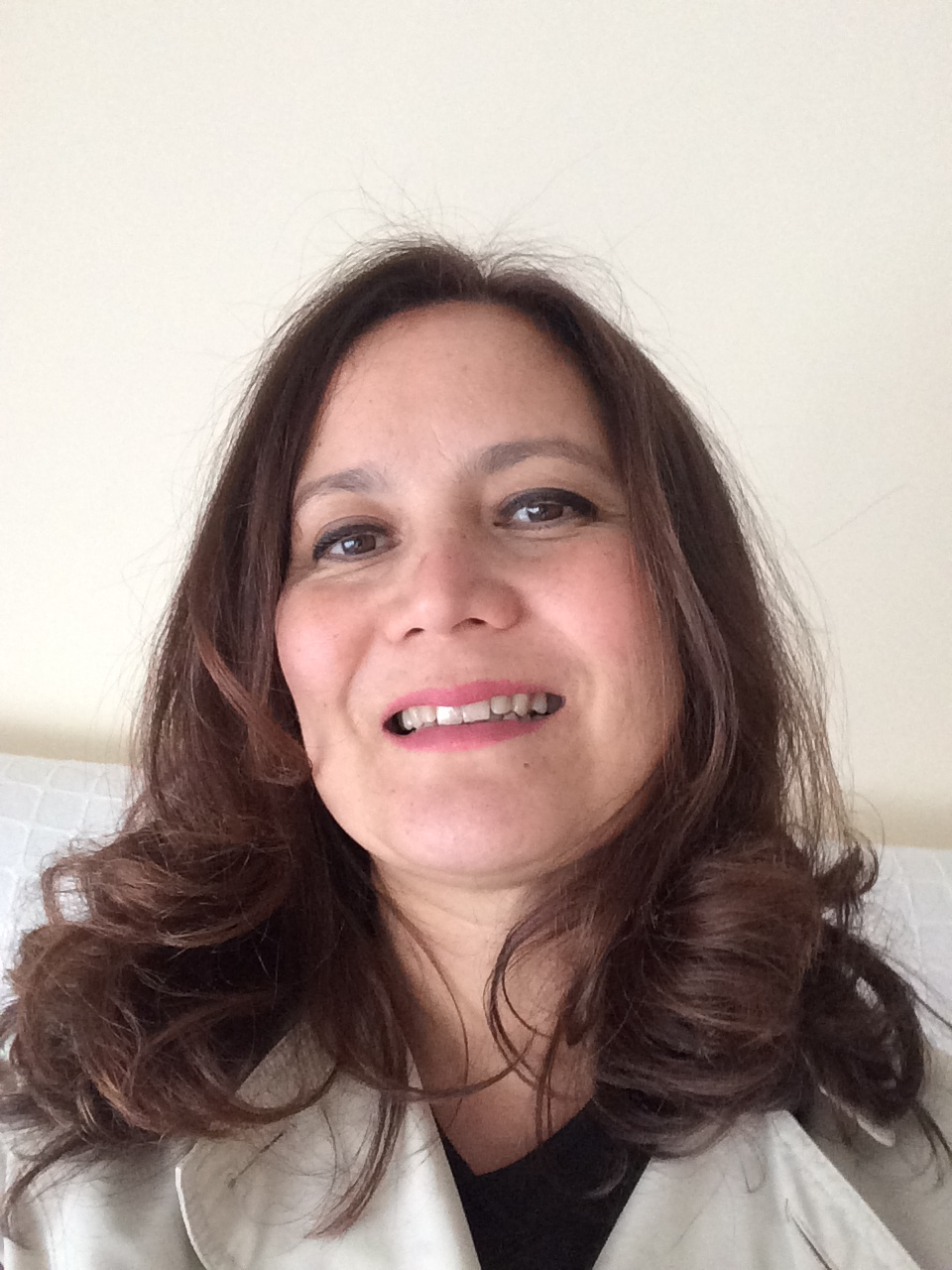
Ana Pouvreau

Pouvreau obtained a B.A in Political Science and Russian at the State University of New York at Stony Brook in 1988 and a M.A in International Relations and Strategic Studies from Boston University in 1991. She also holds a master's degree from the University of Paris X-Nanterre in Russian language and civilization and a diplôme d’études approfondies in Slavic studies from the University of Paris IV-Sorbonne. In 1995, she obtained her PhD from the Sorbonne summa cum laude in Slavic Studies. Her doctoral thesis focused on the attempts of moral rejuvenation in post-Soviet Russian society by former dissident Christian anti-Soviet movements.

Two of the great intellectual influences on her work are Alexander Solzhenitsyn and Alexander Zinoviev. Pouvreau speaks English, French, Russian and she has a basic knowledge of Turkish, Spanish and Italian.

== Publications ==
- POUVREAU, Ana (1996). Une Troisième Voie pour la Russie (A Third way for Russia) (in French). Paris: Editions L’Harmattan. ISBN 2-7384-4888-7.
- POUVREAU, Ana (1998). Les Russes et la sécurité européenne (The Russians and European Security) (in French). Paris: Editions L’Harmattan. ISBN 2-7384-7011-4.
- POUVREAU, Ana (2003). L'Europe globalisée, la fin des illusions (Globalized Europe – The end of illusions) (in French). Paris: Editions L’Harmattan. ISBN 2-7475-2904-5. (Editor and co-author)
- POUVREAU, Ana (2008). Le Système Légion (The French Foreign Legion System) (in French). Paris: Editions L’Esprit du Livre. ISBN 978-2915960419.
- POUVREAU, Ana (2021). En collaboration: Le Nouvel échiquier, la société internationale après la crise de la covid-19 sous la direction de Jean-Claude Empereur et Charles Zorgbibe - Paris: VA Editions. ISBN 2360931644
