= Vadim Tsymburskiy =

Vadim Leonidovich Tsymburskiy
- Born: February 17, 1957; Lvov
- Died: March 23, 2009 (aged 52); Moskva
- Education: Faculty of Philology, Moskva State University (1981)
- Known for: Historian; Candidate of Philological Sciences
- Scientific career
- Fields: Linguistics; Philosophy; Philology; History
- Workplaces: Institute of the United States of America and Canada of the Academy of Sciences of the Union of Soviet Socialist Republics; Institute of Oriental Studies of the Russian Academy of Sciences; Institute of Philosophy of the Russian Academy of Sciences
- Doctoral advisor: Leonid Gindin

Vadim Leonidovich Tsymburskiy (February 17, 1957, in Lvov – March 23, 2009, in Moskva) was a Soviet and Russian philosopher, researcher of geographical politics, philologist, historian and linguist, Homeric Scholar, Etruscologist, Hittitologist, and political scientist.

Vadim Tsymburskiy's scientific interests included the ethnic and linguistic history of the Mediterranean Area in ancient times, the theory and history of geographical politics, issues of civilizational geo– and chronopolitics, the civilizational structure of the modern united world, and problems of analyzing the language of politics. Introduced the concept of limitrof into modern political science.

== Biography ==
He had Polish roots; his grandfather served in the city of his birth after the end of the war in Germany.

In 1981 he graduated from the Philological Faculty of the Mikhail Lomonosov Moskva State University, Department of Classical Philology. From 1981 to 1985, he was a postgraduate student at the Department of Classical Philology at Moskva State University, then a research fellow at the Institute of the United States of America and Canada of the Academy of Sciences of the Union of Soviet Socialist Republics (1986–1990). In 1987 he defended his philological dissertation on the Homeric Epic in light of Balkan toponymy and onomastics.

From 1990 to 1995, Tsymburskiy worked at the Institute of Oriental Studies of the Russian Academy of Sciences, and then, until the end of his life, at the Institute of Philosophy.

He died on March 23, 2009, from cancer.

== Significance ==
Tsymburskiy was one of the founders of Russian theoretical political science, being the leading author and intellectual leader of the Polis Magazine in the 1990s. Although his first articles of a journalistic nature were published back in 1990–1991, he became truly famous after the publication of his programmatic article "Island of Rossiya" in the magazine "Polis" in 1993. Tsymburskiy proposed an original geographical political concept, which had a significant influence on domestic political science. His views subsequently evolved, but he remained a consistent opponent of political conjuncture throughout his life, and his varied, albeit relatively small, creative legacy cannot be confined to narrow disciplinary boundaries. Egor Kholmogorov noted that "Mezhuev and Remizov were inspired by Tsymburskiy with his geographical political isolationism". According to Boris Mezhuev, Tsymburskiy was influenced by the sociology of Talcott Parsons, and in the later period of his work he was influenced by Aleksandr Zinovev. He valued Oswald Spengler – without agreeing with him in his assessment of Bolshevizm, for example. According to Mezhuev, Tsymburskiy "was called upon to become the ideologist of the Russian intellectual class".

== Geographical policy ==
Tsymburskiy's central task was to attempt to revise traditional ideas about Rossiya as a geographical political subject, going beyond the framework of "Westernism" and "Slavophilism". Tsymburskiy introduces the metaphor of "the abduction of Europe", which signifies Rossiya's perception of itself as Europe. This perception, according to Tsymburskiy, which arose as a result of the civilizational choice in the 18th century and determines subsequent Russian policy, is false and at the same time inevitable; it entails constant attempts to interfere in the European space politically and militarily, while Rossiya is constantly rejected by Europe itself. This intervention has the character of imperial strategies. At the end of the 20th century, Rossiya voluntarily deprived itself of control over its border ("limitrof") territories as a result of its awareness of its empire; the collapse of the empire had as its immediate cause a deep political desire for isolationism, which was not recognized by either Russian liberals or nationalists.

One of Tsymburskiy's main political statements was the concept of "Island Rossiya", consistently presented in his article of the same name. This concept was perceived by critics both as a manifesto of Russian isolationism, a conceptual rejection of claims to participate in European affairs as a European subject, and as a polemic with the Eurasians regarding the maximum and minimum natural boundaries of a separate civilization and, at the same time, a state.

== Historical and philological research ==
In the monograph "Homer and the History of the Eastern Mediterranean" (1996), written jointly with his teacher Leonid Gindin, he examined Hittite texts about the Achaeans (Ahhiyawa), Wilusa (Ilion) and Truisa (Troy), and references to the Lycians and Hittites in epic tales of the Trojan War. In the last years of his life he studied Asia Minor – Etruscan connections.

== Publications ==
=== Works on philology ===
- Leonid Gindin, Vadim Tsymburskiy (1986). "The Ancient Version of the Historical Event Reflected in KUB XXIII, 13". Herald of Ancient History (Magazine) (1 (176)). Science: 81–87.
- Homeric Epic and Ethnogenesis of Northwestern Anatolia. Dissertation of Candidate of Philological Sciences. Moskva, 1987
- Bellerofont and Beller (Reminiscence of the Ancient Balkan Myth in the Greek Tradition) // Ancient Balkan Studies. Moskva, 1987
- Homer and the History of the Eastern Mediterranean – Moskva, Vostochnaya Literatura. 1996. 328 Pages. 2000 Copies (Co–Authored with Leonid Gindin)
- The Homeric Epic and the Legendary Tradition of Anatolia // Asia – Dialogue of Civilizations. Essays. Moskva, 1996. Pages 241–327
- Anchises the Serpent. On the Regeneration of the Early Thracian Motif in Virgil's Aeneid // Herald of Ancient History. 1996. No. 4. Pages 29–42
- Hetto–Homerica. The Naming of Odysseus and the Naming of the Evil Brother in the Hittite "Tale of Appu and His Sons" // Herald of Ancient History. 2005. No. 2. Pages 14–26
- The Greek Verb ταρχύω "I Bury" and the Asia Minor Myth About the Defeat of the Victorious God // Bulletin of Ancient History. 2007. No. 1. Page 152

=== Works on political science ===
- Military Doctrine of the Union of Soviet Socialist Republics and Rossiya: Understanding the Concepts of "Threat" and "Victory" in the Second Half of the 20th Century – Moskva: Russian Scientific Foundation – Moskva Branch, 1994
- Open Society: From Metaphor to Its Rationalization – Moskva: Moskva Scientific Foundation, 1997 (co–authored with Mikhail Ilin)
- Rossiya – the Land Beyond the Great Limitrof: Civilization and Its Geographical Policy – Moskva: URSS, 1999
- The Struggle for the Eurasian Atlantis: Geographical Economics and Geographical Strategy – Moskva: Institute of Economic Strategies, 2000
- Island Rossiya. Geopolitical and Chronopolitical Works. 1993–2006 – Moskva: Russian Political Encyclopedia, 2007
- Morphology of Russian Geographical Policy and the Dynamics of International Systems in the 18th–20th Centuries. Moskva: Knizhny Mir, 2016. 496 Pages

=== Scientific databases ===
- In the Google Scholar Database
- In the Russian Science Citation Index Database

== Sources ==
- Boris Mezhuev. Political Criticism of Vadim Tsymburskiy – Moskva: Evropa, 2012
