= Pierre Hassner =

20th and 21st-century Romanian-French philosopher and academic

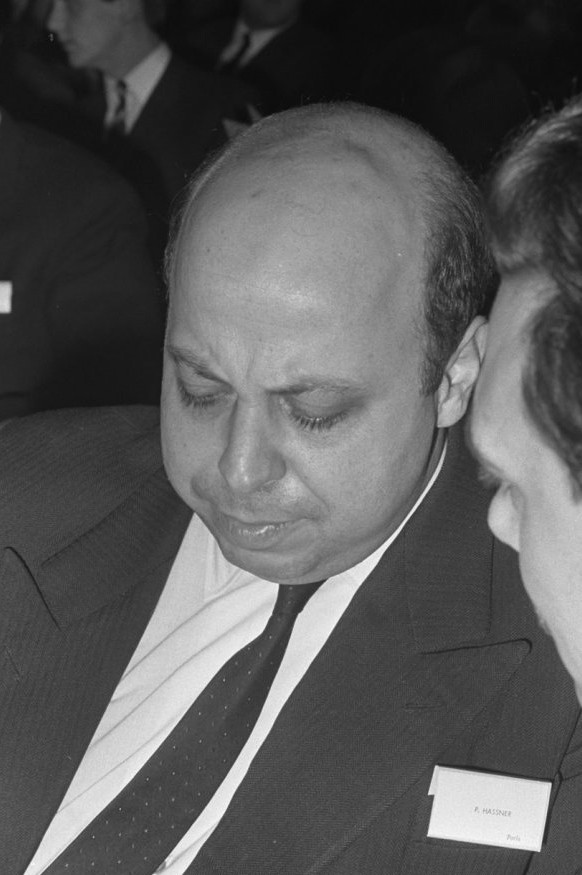
- Born: 31 January 1933; Bucharest, Romania
- Died: 26 May 2018 (aged 85); 15th arrondissement of Paris, France
- Spouse: Scarlet Nikolska
- Awards: Alexis de Tocqueville award

Academic background
- Education: École normale supérieure
- Influences: Leo Strauss; Raymond Aron

Academic work
- Era: 20th and 21st-century philosophy
- Discipline: geopolitics; sociology; philosophy
- Sub-discipline: Political philosophy
- Institutions: Paris Institute of Political Studies; University of Bologna

Pierre Hassner (31 January 1933 – 26 May 2018) was a Romanian-born French geopolitical scientist and philosopher.

He was director of research emeritus at Center for International Studies and Research and at the Paris Institute of Political Studies (Sciences Po). He has also taught at the European Center at Johns Hopkins University in Bologna.

In 2003, he received the Alexis de Tocqueville award.

== Biography ==
Hassner was born in Bucharest, Romania. He was of Romanian Jewish origin. Hassner moved to France in 1948 at the age of fifteen with his parents who were fleeing the communist regime. The same year, he read The Great Schism by Raymond Aron, a book that left a deep impression upon him. He joined the École normale supérieure, obtaining the agrégation in philosophy in 1955. He became one of the students of Raymond Aron and Leo Strauss.

In his Memoirs published in 1983, Raymond Aron wrote: "In I do not know what circumstances, Pierre Hassner, who sometimes attended my classes, gave a brilliant, dizzying presentation on Thucydides ... I told him that never, from a student or teacher, had I heard a speech of comparable quality." Under the direction of Aaron, he had begun a thesis, that was never completed.

In 1957, he acquired French nationality.

From 1992, he assumed the presidency of the Kosovo Committee.

Hassner died in the 15th arrondissement of Paris.

== Theories ==
Pierre Hassner devoted himself to the study of international relations and geopolitical problems, which he wished to shed light on with philosophy. In his numerous articles and books, he offered informed and original analyses of the evolution of international conflicts during the Cold War era, and after the fall of the Berlin Wall. He thus became involved in the political debate at the time of the war which divided the peoples of the former Yugoslavia between 1991 and 1995. His research focuses on war, violence and totalitarianism, international relations notably in the history of political thought and in Europe after the Cold War. In his theories on totalitarianism and post-Cold War] world political evolution, he analyzed Chinese and Russian political regimes and, to qualify them, coined the neologism of "democrature", to denote States which are no longer under totalitarian regime but are not yet democracies and therefore hide their authoritarian nature under a democratic facade (parliamentary and constitutional democracy in Russia or in China).

In a famous article, Hassner shows that we have gone from the world of Locke ("Liberty as property, post-Cold War liberalism"), with openings on Kant ("project of perpetual peace" to be compared with the emergence of international organizations such as the United Nations, in the world of Hobbes, that is to say the war of all against all, and the search for maximum security, with overtures on Nietzsche (war as an agent of identity reaffirmation) and Marx (socio-economic disparities as a still a valid reading grid for international relations). Thus he sees in the events of September 11 and the policies that followed (preventive wars, laws on terrorism which reinforce the powers of the State, to the detriment of freedoms) as a victory of the security conceptions of Hobbes, Nietzsche and Marx over conceptions imprinted with freedom from thinkers such as Kant and Locke).

== Works ==
- Change and Security in Europe, Adelphi Papers 45 and 48, London, International Institute for Strategic Studies, 1968
- "Kant" and "Hegel", edited by Leo Strauss and Joseph Cropsey, History of Political Philosophy, Chicago, 1973.
- La Revanche des passions: Métamorphoses de la violence et crises du politique, Paris, Fayard, 2015
- Justifier la guerre? De l'humanitaire au contre-terrorisme (with Gilles Andréani, ed.), Paris, Presses de Sciences Po, 2005.
- La Terreur et l'Empire. La violence et la paix II, Paris, Le Seuil, 2003.
- Guerre et sociétés. États et violence après la guerre froide (with Roland Marchal, ed.), Paris, Karthala, 2003.
- Washington et le Monde. Dilemmes d'une superpuissance (with Justin Vaïsse), Paris, Autrement, 2003.
- La Violence et la Paix. De la bombe atomique au nettoyage ethnique, Paris, Le Seuil. (Coll. "Points"), 2000. Partial and augmented re-edition of four texts of the work published by Éditions Esprit in 1995.
