= Prix Alexis de Tocqueville =

International prize

The Prix Alexis de Tocqueville is an international prize for political literature. It is awarded every two years to a person who has demonstrated outstanding humanistic qualities and attachment to public liberties and seeks to perpetuate Alexis de Tocqueville’s ideals.

It was created in 1979 by Pierre Godefroy, mayor of the nearby town of Valognes and Alain Peyrefitte, a noted author, member of the Académie Française and politician.

The jury of this prestigious award is currently chaired by former French President Valéry Giscard d’Estaing, and includes Sandra O'Connor, professor Harvey C Mansfield and a number of other eminent members. The last two American recipients of the Prize were General Colin Powell and Mr. Zbigniew Brzezinski.

The Association organizing the Prize is now headed by the Countess Stéphanie de Tocqueville. The Prize is awarded at the Chateau de Tocqueville.

== Recipients ==
- 1979: Raymond Aron (France)
- 1980: David Riesman (USA)
- 1982: Alexander Zinoviev (USSR)
- 1984: Karl Popper (Austria)
- 1987: Louis Dumont (France)
- 1989: Octavio Paz (Mexico)
- 1990: Kyriakos Mitsotakis (Greece)
- 1991: François Furet (France)
- 1994: Leszek Kołakowski (Poland)
- 1997: Michel Crozier (France)
- 1999: Daniel Bell (USA)
- 2003: Pierre Hassner (France)
- 2006: Colin Powell (USA)
- 2008: Raymond Boudon (France)
- 2010: Zbigniew Brzezinski (USA)
- 2014: Philippe Raynaud (France)
- 2018: Henry Kissinger (USA)
