= Yawning Heights =

1976 novel by Alexander Zinoviev

Yawning Heights (Russian: Зияющие Высоты, romanized: Ziyayushchiye Vysoty) is the first published novel by Soviet philosopher Alexander Zinoviev. It was published in 1976. Set in the fictional city / nation of Ibansk, Yawning Heights satirizes Soviet society. The novel has been compared to the writings of Jonathan Swift, Lewis Carroll, and others.

Every character in Yawning Heights is named Iban Ibanovich Ibanov, so each is instead referred to by a descriptive name, rather than their proper name. Multiple characters in the book are references to prominent thinkers at the time, including one character who is thought to be a stand-in for the author.

== Satire ==
As a logician, Zinoviev was able to reduce many features of Soviet communism to what he calls "scientific laws". The book is also filled with numerous paradoxes and logical twists, à la Catch-22. The book begins with a logically reflexive definition: a preface claims that the book details the result of an experiment. The preface identifies the purpose of the experiment: "to uncover those who disapprove of its implementation, and to take the appropriate measures".

One satire in a late chapter is that, after conquering the whole world in the Great Ibanskian Kissoff, the leaders of Ibansk discover another nation, Sub-Ibansk, whose inhabitants live underground beneath Ibansk and subsist on the sewage generated by Ibansk.

== Title ==
The title of the book is a pun on a cliche of Soviet ideological propaganda, describing communism as the "shining heights". The words "yawning" and "shining" in Russian are identical, except for the first letter: a Z in the case of "yawning", and an S in the case of "shining".

The "yawning" in the generally accepted translation of the Russian title does not refer to a "yawn" but rather to its meaning as in "yawning abyss". To capture the paradoxical nature of the Russian title, someone suggested that a better translation would have been "abysmal heights" (the primary meaning of abysmal derives from abyss).

== English translation ==
Yawning Heights was translated into English by Gordon Clough and published in 1979.
