= Valentin Asmus (philosopher) =

Russian philosopher (1894–1975)

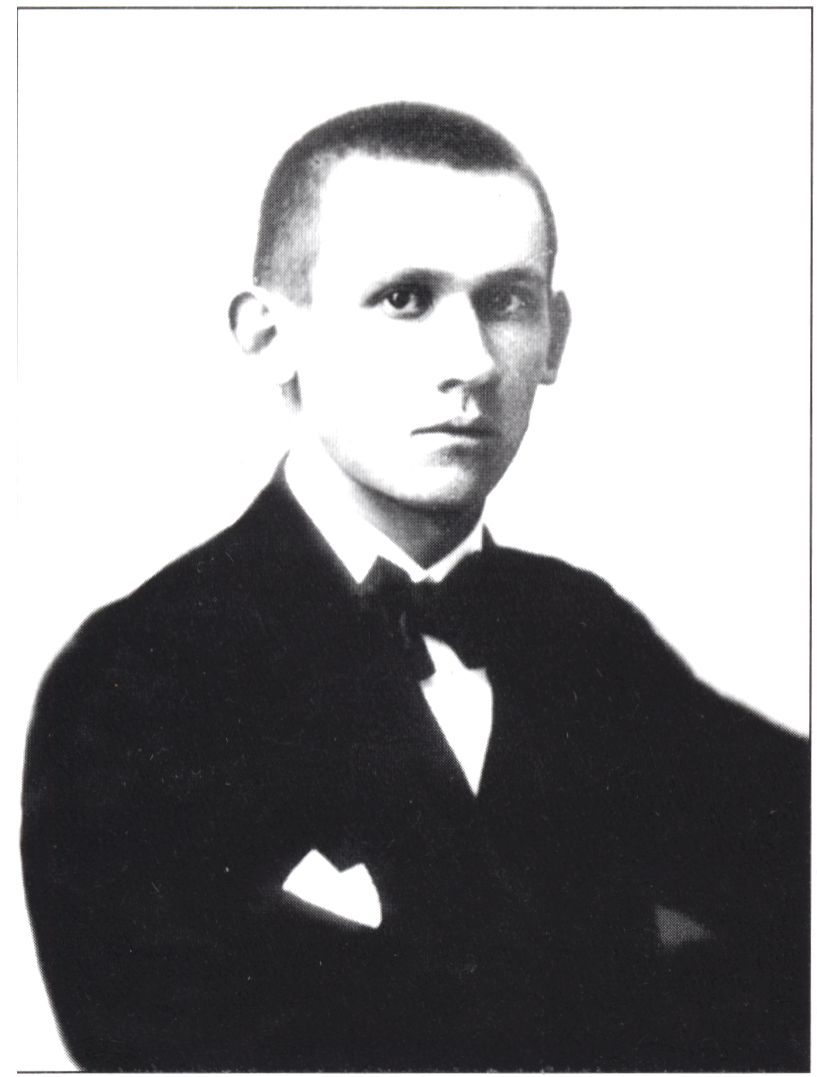

Valentin Ferdinandovich Asmus (Russian: Валенти́н Фердина́ндович А́смус; December 30, 1894 – June 4, 1975) was a Russian and Soviet philosopher. He was one of the small group who continued the classical European philosophical tradition through the early Soviet times. He was an independent thinker and unorthodox Marxist, with interests in the history of philosophy and aesthetics.

He graduated from St. Vladimir University in 1919, then moved to Moscow in 1927. At this period he attacked the views of William James. In the mid-1920s, he was a theorist of literary constructivism.

Through his wife Irina, he became a friend of Boris Pasternak, from about 1931. His major work Marx and Bourgeois Historicism (1933) was influenced by György Lukács. At this point an opponent of formal logic, he changed position and wrote a textbook on it. There is a story of his being summoned to see Joseph Stalin, and required to give logic lectures to Red Army generals.

He was Professor at Moscow State University from 1942 to 1972. In the 1960s he edited Plato, with Aleksei Losev. Outside the Soviet Union, Asmus was mostly known for his contributions to studying Immanuel Kant.
