= Political views of Mikhail Gorbachev =

Mikhail Gorbachev's ideology changed from orthodox Stalinism to what was conventional Marxist–Leninism within the USSR, and further to his ideas of Perestroika while he was in power as Soviet leader.

== Early orthodoxy ==
According to his university friend Zdeněk Mlynář, in the early 1950s "Gorbachev, like everyone else at the time, was a Stalinist". Mlynář noted, however, that unlike most other Soviet students, Gorbachev did not view Marxism simply as "a collection of axioms to be committed to memory". Biographers Doder and Branson related that after Stalin's death, Gorbachev's "ideology would never be doctrinal again", but noted that he remained "a true believer" in the Soviet system. Doder and Branson noted that at the Twenty-Seventh Party Congress in 1986, Gorbachev was seen to be an orthodox Marxist–Leninist; that year, the biographer Zhores Medvedev stated that "Gorbachev is neither a liberal nor a bold reformist".

== Adapting and thinking ==
Even before he left office, Gorbachev had become a kind of social democrat—believing in, as he later put it, equality of opportunity, publicly supported education and medical care, a guaranteed minimum of social welfare, and a "socially oriented market economy"—all within a democratic political framework. Exactly when this transformation occurred is hard to say, but surely by 1989 or 1990 it had taken place.

— Gorbachev biographer William Taubman, 2017

By the mid-1980s, when Gorbachev took power, many analysts were arguing that the Soviet Union was declining to the status of a Third World country. In this context, Gorbachev argued that the Communist Party had to adapt and engage in creative thinking much as Lenin had creatively interpreted and adapted the writings of Karl Marx and Friedrich Engels to the situation of early 20th century Russia. For instance, he thought that rhetoric about global revolution and overthrowing the bourgeoisie had become too dangerous in an era where nuclear warfare could obliterate humanity. He began to move away from the Marxist–Leninist belief in class struggle as the engine of political change, instead viewing politics as a way of coordinating the interests of all classes. However, as Gooding noted, the changes that Gorbachev proposed were "expressed wholly within the terms of Marxist-Leninist ideology".

According to Doder and Branson, Gorbachev wanted to "dismantle the hierarchical military society at home and abandon the grand-style, costly, imperialism abroad". Jonathan Steele argued that Gorbachev failed to appreciate why the Baltic nations wanted independence and "at heart he was, and remains, a Russian imperialist". Gooding thought that Gorbachev was "committed to democracy", marking him out as different from his predecessors. Gooding also suggested that when in power, Gorbachev came to see socialism not as a place on the path to communism, but a destination in itself.

Gorbachev's political outlook was shaped by the 23 years he served as a party official in Stavropol. Doder and Branson thought that throughout most of his political career prior to becoming general secretary, "his publicly expressed views almost certainly reflected a politician's understanding of what should be said, rather than his personal philosophy. Otherwise he could not have survived politically." Like many Russians, Gorbachev sometimes thought of the Soviet Union as being largely synonymous with Russia and in various speeches described it as "Russia"; in one incident he had to correct himself after calling the USSR "Russia" while giving a speech in Kiev.

== Perestroika ==
McCauley noted that perestroika was "an elusive concept", one which "evolved and eventually meant something radically different over time". McCauley stated that the concept originally referred to "radical reform of the economic and political system" as part of Gorbachev's attempt to motivate the labor force and make management more effective. It was only after initial measures to achieve this proved unsuccessful that Gorbachev began to consider market mechanisms and co-operatives, albeit with the state sector remaining dominant. The political scientist John Gooding suggested that had the perestroika reforms succeeded, the Soviet Union would have "exchanged totalitarian controls for milder authoritarian ones" although not become "democratic in the Western sense". With perestroika, Gorbachev had wanted to improve the existing Marxist–Leninist system but ultimately ended up destroying it. In this, he brought an end to state socialism in the Soviet Union and paved the way for a transition to liberal democracy.

Taubman nevertheless thought Gorbachev remained a socialist. He described Gorbachev as "a true believer—not in the Soviet system as it functioned (or didn't) in 1985 but in its potential to live up to what he deemed its original ideals". He added that "until the end, Gorbachev reiterated his belief in socialism, insisting that it wasn't worthy of the name unless it was truly democratic". As Soviet leader, Gorbachev believed in incremental reform rather than a radical transformation; he later referred to this as a "revolution by evolutionary means". Doder and Branson noted that over the course of the 1980s, his thought underwent a "radical evolution". Taubman noted that by 1989 or 1990, Gorbachev had transformed into a social democrat. McCauley suggested that by at least June 1991 Gorbachev was a "post-Leninist", having "liberated himself" from Marxism–Leninism. After the fall of the Soviet Union, the newly formed Communist Party of the Russian Federation would have nothing to do with him. In 2006, he expressed his continued belief in Lenin's ideas: "I trusted him then and I still do". He claimed that "the essence of Lenin" was a desire to develop "the living creative activity of the masses". Taubman believed that Gorbachev identified with Lenin on a psychological level.

== Sources ==
- Bunce, Valerie (1992). "On Gorbachev". The Soviet and Post-Soviet Review. 19 (1): 199–206. doi:10.1163/187633292X00108.
- Doder, Dusko; Branson, Louise (1990). Gorbachev: Heretic in the Kremlin. London: Futura. ISBN 978-0-70884940-8.
- Gooding, John (1990). "Gorbachev and Democracy". Soviet Studies. 42 (2): 195–231. doi:10.1080/09668139008411864. JSTOR 152078.
- McCauley, Martin (1998). Gorbachev. Profiles in Power. London and New York: Longman. ISBN 978-0-58221597-9.
- Medvedev, Zhores (1986). Gorbachev. Oxford: Basil Blackwell. ISBN 978-0-39302308-4.
- Steele, Jonathan (1996). "Why Gorbachev Failed". New Left Review. 216: 141–152.
- Taubman, William (2017). Gorbachev: His Life and Times. New York City: Simon and Schuster. ISBN 978-1-47114796-8.
