= Yevgenia Albats =

Russian investigative journalist, political scientist, writer and radio host (born 1958)

- Евгения Альбац
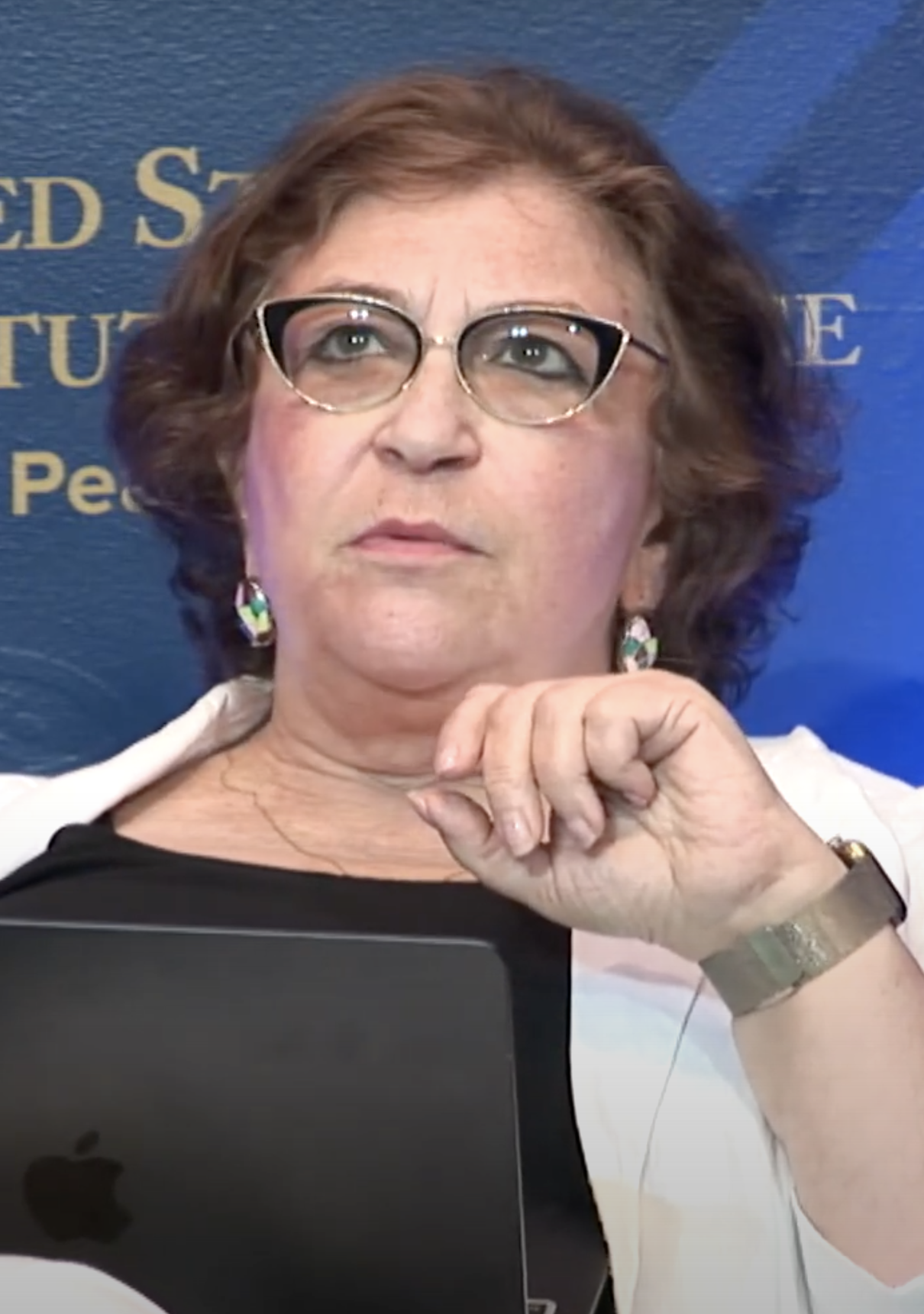
- Albats in 2023
- Born: Yevgenia Markovna Albats; 5 September 1958 (age 68); Moscow, RSFSR
- Education: Moscow State University (1980); Harvard University
- Occupation: Chief Editor of The New Times magazine
- Spouse: Yaroslav Golovanov
- Children: 1

Yevgenia Markovna Albats (Russian: Евге́ния Ма́рковна Альба́ц, born 5 September 1958) is a Russian investigative journalist, political scientist, writer and radio host.

In 1986–1992, Albats worked as a columnist for Moskovskie Novosti. Since 1995, she has worked with the newspapers Izvestia, Novaya Gazeta and Kommersant. From 2004 to February 2022, she was the host of the author's program "Full Albats" on Echo of Moscow radio station. As of 2022, she works as a chief editor of The New Times magazine.

In 1994–1996, she studied at Harvard University's Department of Political Science, after which she lectured on the political system of the USSR and Russia at a number of leading universities in the United States. In January 2004, Albats defended her doctoral dissertation in political science at Harvard University.

== Early life and education ==
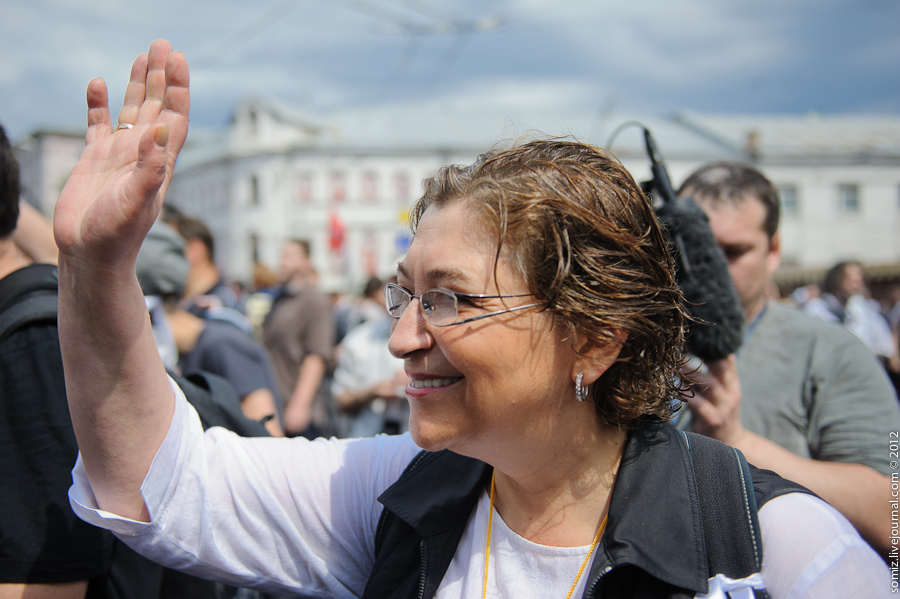
Albats at the Bolotnaya protests in Moscow, 2012

Albats was born in Moscow, in Russia when it was the epicenter of the Soviet Union, to a Jewish family.

Albats' father, Mark Yefremovich Albats, was a member of a GRU military reconnaissance team during World War II, residing in German-occupied Ukraine. In 1943 he was wounded and discharged from the Army. Afterward he worked as an engineer at a scientific institution, designing radiolocation systems for the Soviet Army. Albats' mother, Yelena Izmaylovskaya, was an actress and a radio news host. Albats' elder sister, Tatyana Komarova, was a television host/anchor.

Yevgenia Albats graduated from the Department of Journalism of Moscow State University in 1980. One of her classmates was Anna Politkovskaya, who would become an investigative journalist and was assassinated in 2006.

== Journalism career ==
Albats started her professional work as a freelance reporter with Komsomolskaya Pravda, while she was still a senior at the Moscow State University's Department of Journalism. After graduation, she succeeded in getting a job as a low-paid assistant at the "letters" desk (the desk that was obliged to answer letters from readers of the paper) at Izvestia Sunday supplement, Nedelya. At the same time, she started writing about astrophysics and particle physics for the same paper. From 1986 to 1992, she worked for The Moscow News as a special assignment correspondent, writing about the USSR's notorious political police, the KGB. In 1996 to 2006, she worked for Izvestia (led the weekly column We and Our Children) and Novaya Gazeta.

She received the Golden Pen Award from the Russian Union of Journalists for exposing poor conditions in maternity wards in 1989.

Albats was fired from Izvestia in 1997 after she had completed a major article exposing alleged illegal activities by the FSB. She was restored to her position by a court decision on 15 March 1997.

In 2007, Albats became a deputy chief editor of The New Times magazine. On 16 January 2009 she replaced Irena Lesnevskaya as the Chief Editor of the magazine.

Since 2013, she is one of the jury members of the European Press Prize.

== Political activities ==
From 1993 to 2000, she was a member of the Clemency Commission at the Executive Office of the President of the Russian Federation.

== Research and works ==
Albats was a Fellow at Harvard University's Nieman Foundation for Journalism in 1993 (Fellowship at the Nieman Foundation).

In 2004 Albats was awarded a PhD in political science from Harvard University. She works at the radio station Echo of Moscow and writes for The Moscow Times.

In 1992 Albats was appointed a consultant for a Russian Duma commission to examine KGB involvement in Soviet coup attempt of 1991. This commission was led by Lev Ponomaryov. As a member of this commission she interviewed KGB officers. Albats described her findings in The State Within a State: The KGB and Its Hold on Russia – Past, Present, and Future in 1994. KGB chairman Vadim Bakatin gave Albats the number of KGB officers as 180,000 in a post-1991 interview. Using the "rule of thumb", "four non-ranking KGB employees for every officer", Albats estimated that the number of KGB employees in Russia in 1992 approached 700,000, "one [political police agent] for every 297 citizens of Russia", as opposed to "one Chekist for every 428 Soviet citizens."

Albats described the KGB as a leading political force rather than a security organization. She wrote that KGB directors Lavrenty Beria, Yuri Andropov and Vladimir Kryuchkov manipulated Communist Party leaders. She asserted that FSB, the successor of KGB, became a totalitarian party.

In 1992 Albats published an article in Izvestia quoting documents from KGB archives that David Karr was "a competent KGB source" who "submitted information to the KGB on the technical capabilities of the United States and other capitalist countries". She cited KGB notes describing transfers of money to communist parties of United States, Finland, France, Italy, as well as "commercial dealings" of Rajiv Gandhi's family with Soviet foreign trade. Albats learned that the KGB employed the future Russian Patriarch Alexius II as an agent under a nickname Drozdov.

Albats, who is Jewish, is a leader in the Russian Jewish Congress.

Albats published a book, The Jewish question, in 1995.

== Talk shows ==
As of 2004, Albats hosted a radio talk program at Echo of Moscow. In February 2007, she held a talk with Olga Kryshtanovskaya, director of the Moscow-based Centre for the Study of Elites. Kryshtanovskaya said that FSB members and other "siloviks" took key positions in the Russian government, Parliament and business. These members share their military background and nationalistic views. She noted that most FSB members remain in the "acting reserve" even when they formally leave the organization. All "acting reserve" members receive an FSB salary, follow FSB instructions, and remain above the law because their organization protects them, according to Kryshtanovskaya.

In 2006, Albats criticized Anna Arutunyan who had written an article in The Moscow News about the murdered journalist Anna Politkovskaya. Arutunyan wrote that Politkovskaya became an activist and that her articles contained "inaccuracies".

== Family and personal life ==
Albats was married to journalist, writer and science popularizer Yaroslav Golovanov and has a daughter, Olga (b. 1988).
