= Institute of Applied Politics =

Institute of Applied Politics may refer to:

- Ray C. Bliss Institute of Applied Politics, a nonpartisan research and educational organization at the University of Akron in Akron, OH, USA
- Institute of Applied Politics, Moscow (Russian: Институт прикладной политики), a think tank headed by Olga Kryshtanovskaya
- Institute of Applied Politics, Lithuania, (Lithuanian: Taikomosios politikos institutas), an independent social, cultural, educational organization founded by Šarūnas Gustainis
