= Chekism =

Russian term describing mafia-like control of society by secret services

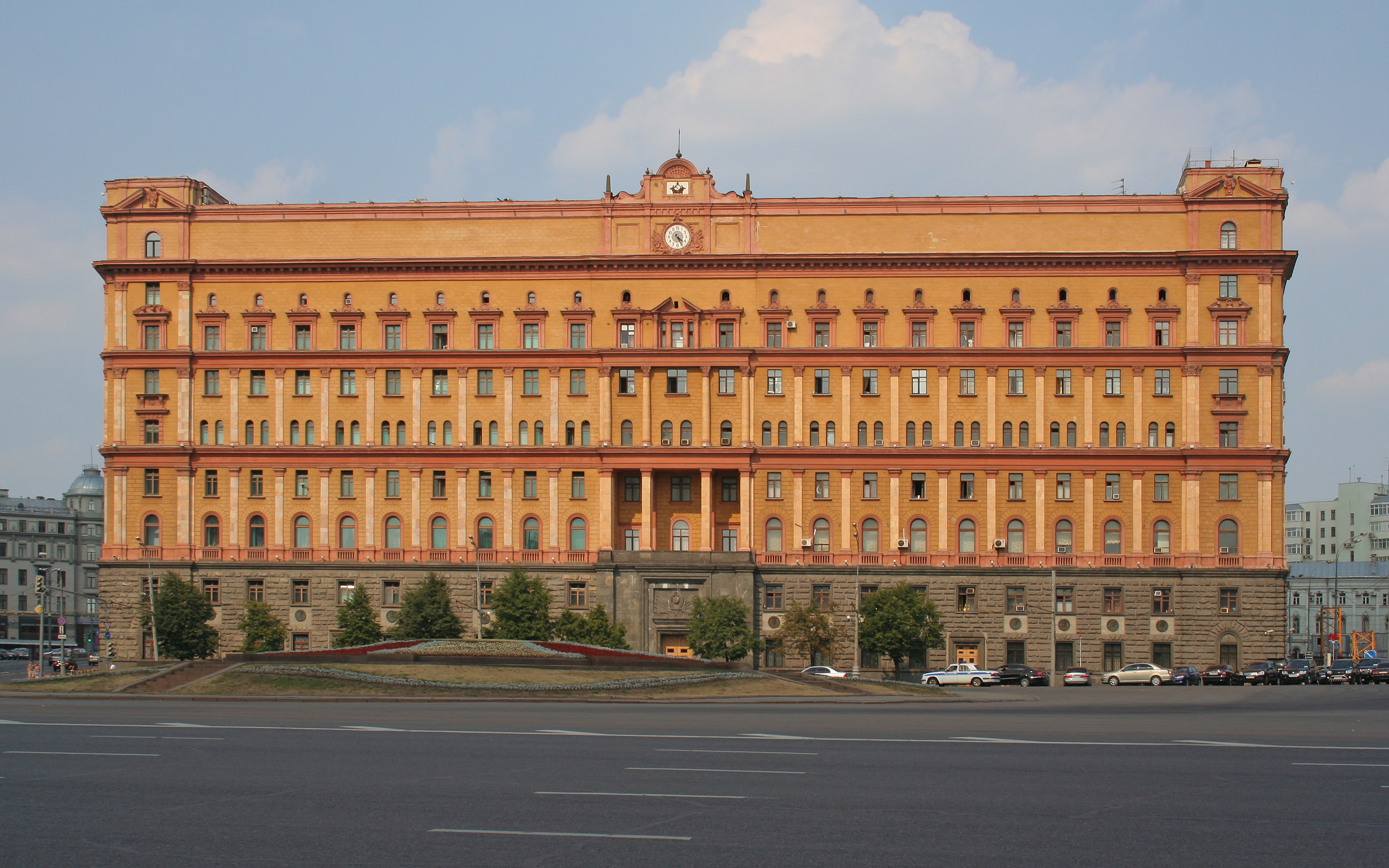
The Lubyanka Building in Moscow has served as the headquarters for Soviet and Russian intelligence agencies since 1917, and the term Lubyanka has become a metonym for the secret police.

Chekism (Russian: Чекизм) was the form of counterintelligence state widely present in the Soviet Union by which secret police, counterintelligence and internal security services (originally the Cheka, hence the name, but most famously the KGB) strongly controlled all spheres of society. Similar circumstances exist in some post-Soviet states, particularly Russia. The term encompasses both the ideological underpinnings justifying often arbitrary repression as well as the political situation where security service members occupy high-level political offices and a lack of civilian control over their activities (in extreme cases, the opposite). The term is sometimes also applied to other Eastern Bloc security services (long-serving East German security chief Erich Mielke was fond of calling himself a Chekist), and, presently, to the federal government of Russia under Vladimir Putin (himself a former KGB officer).

The name is derived from Cheka, the colloquial name of the All-Russian Extraordinary Commission which first in the succession of Soviet secret police agencies. (Note: The All-Russian Extraordinary Commission, also known simply as the Extraordinary Commission (Russian: Чрезвычайная Комиссия, romanized: Chrezvychaynaya Kommisiya), abbreviated in Russian as ЧК; Che-Ka.) Officers of the succession of security agencies (Cheka, GPU, OGPU, NKVD, GUGB, NKGB, MGB, MVD, and, longest-lasting, the KGB), as well as their Russian successors, the Federal Security Service, are often referred to, both by themselves and by the broader public, as "Chekists".

== Soviet Union ==
Chekism is described as a product of the practices and doctrines introduced to the then-new Soviet security services by their first chief executive, Felix Dzerzhinsky. These protocols encouraged security officers to see repression as justified, necessary, and romanticized.

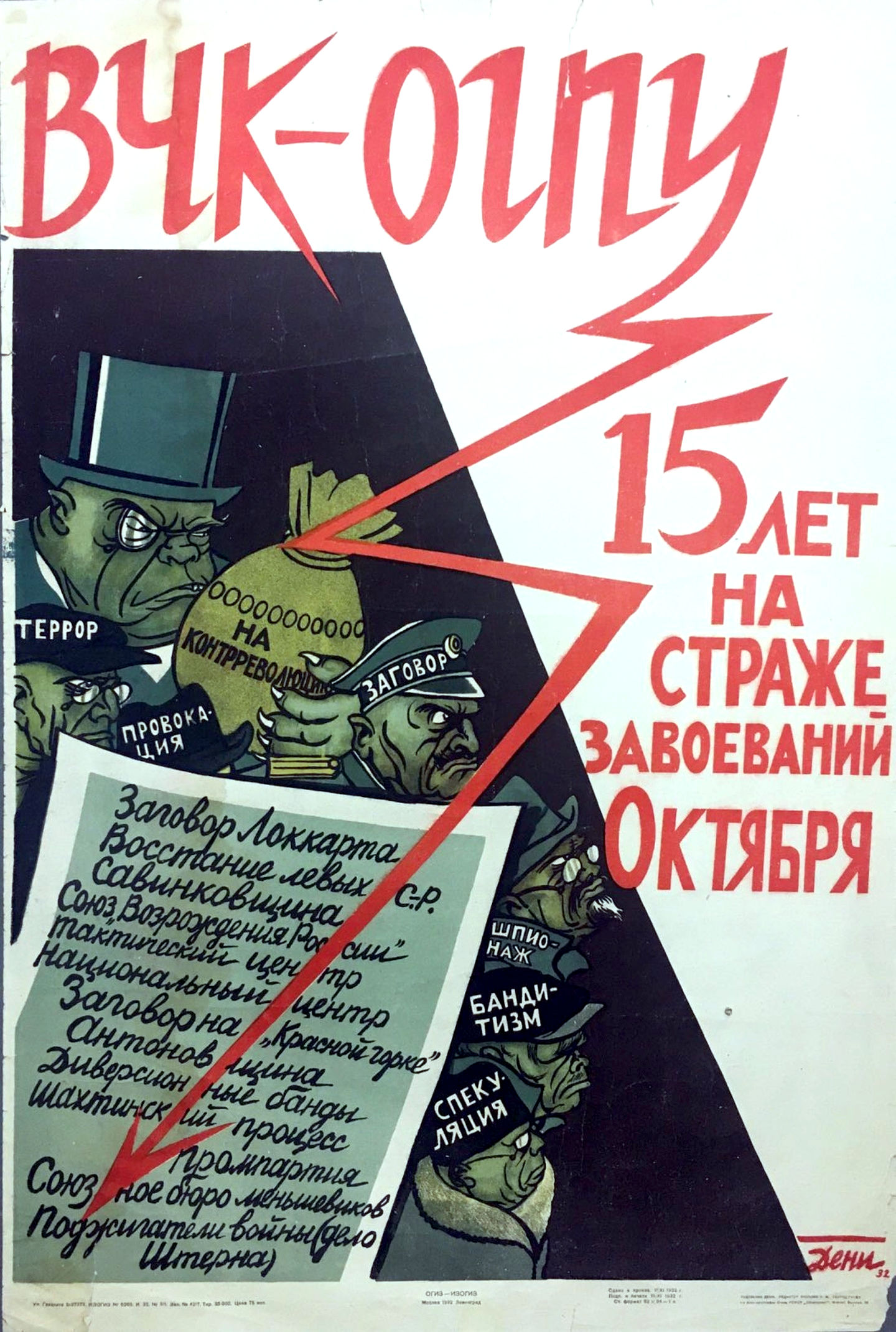
A 1932 Soviet propaganda poster with the text "15 Years of Guarding the October Gains" shows a list of alleged anti-Soviet conspiracies getting struck by Cheka—OGPU lightning.

The term was first defined in a 1950 Russian émigré journal by Soviet defector and Kremlinologist Abdurakhman Avtorkhanov, who described the Soviet secret police (which he called the NKVD. though in 1950 the security service was the MGB) as the key structure behind Stalin's dictatorship:

It is not true that power and authority in the Soviet Union are shared between the [Communist] Party and the military clique ... [or] that the Politburo of the Party's Central Committee is an omnipotent superpower ... The Politburo, although bright, is still only a shadow of the real superpower that stands behind the chair of every Politburo member. The Politburo members themselves know it for sure, the Party vaguely guesses it, and the people are apathetic to "high politics". People are taught not to think. One absolute power thinks, acts and dictates for everyone. The name of this force — the NKVD / MVD / MGB ... The Stalinist regime is held together not by the organization of Soviets, Party ideals, the Politburo, or Stalin’s personality, but by the organization and technical skill of the Soviet political police, in which Stalin himself plays the role of the police chief ... To say the NKVD is the state secret police conveys very little ... To say that the NKVD is a "state within a state" belittles the NKVD, for the mere formulation allows for the presence of two forces: the normal government and that of the supernormal NKVD; while there is only one actual force — universal Chekism. Chekism of the State, Chekism of the Party, Chekism of the collective, Chekism of the individual. Chekism in ideology, Chekism in practice. Chekism from top to bottom. Chekism from the all-powerful Stalin to an insignificant informant.

The last KGB Chairman Vadim Bakatin, who was appointed to dismantle the KGB in late 1991 after the failed August Coup, also frequently used the term. In his book "Getting rid of the KGB", published in 1992, he described the origin and meaning of Chekism as follows:

The system of suppression established after the October Revolution carried from its first steps the rapidly growing germ of permissiveness and immorality that was justified by revolutionary purposefulness ... The leaders of Bolshevism, highlighting the class struggle, a kind of "Bolshevik Jacobinism", absolutized the importance of the state as an instrument of power and gave a special place in it to punitive instruments. A network of Cheka organs entangled the entire structure of civil and military institutions of the vast country. By carrying out arrests, investigations, sentences, executions, and mass shootings of "hostages" with the sanction of the Party at its own discretion, the Cheka elevated terror and lawlessness to the category of state policy.

From that time of revolutionary arbitrariness originated the particular ideology of "Chekism", which has been polished and licked clean by subsequent generations of Communist Party ideologists and publicists parasitising on "criminal-patriotic" romance. This ideology turned out to be more resilient than the structures that gave birth to it ...

An enemy is always needed. Without one, the meaninglessness of the system becomes clear. That is why "Chekism" is a constant search for an "enemy" according to the conveniently invented formula: "whoever is not with us is against us." Chekism was a constant, unrestricted search for and violence against anyone who did not fit into the rigid scheme of the ideology of the Bolshevik Party. It is the complete merger of the ideology of the secret services not with the law, but with the ideology of the ruling party.

== Contemporary Russia ==
According to former Russian Duma member Konstantin Borovoi, "[Vladimir] Putin's appointment is the culmination of the KGB's crusade for power. This is its finale. Now the KGB runs the country." Olga Kryshtanovskaya, director of the Moscow-based Center for the Study of Elites, has found that up to 78% of 1,016 leading political figures in Russia have served previously in organizations affiliated with the KGB or FSB. She said: "If in the Soviet period and the first post-Soviet period, the KGB and FSB people were mainly involved in security issues, now half are still involved in security but the other half are involved in business, political parties, NGOs, regional governments, even culture... They started to use all political institutions."

The KGB or FSB members usually remain in the "acting reserve" even if they formally leave the organization ("acting reserve" members receive a second FSB salary, follow FSB instructions, and remain "above the law" being protected by the organization, according to Kryshtanovskaya). As Putin said, "There is no such thing as a former KGB man". Soon after becoming prime minister of Russia, Putin also perhaps somewhat jokingly claimed that "A group of FSB colleagues dispatched to work undercover in the government has successfully completed its first mission." Moreover, the FSB has formal membership, military discipline, and an extensive network of civilian informants, hardcore ideology, and support of population (60% of Russians trust the FSB), which according to Yevgenia Albats and Catherine A. Fitzpatrick makes it a perfect totalitarian political party.

Some observers note that the current Russian state security organization the FSB is even more powerful than the KGB was, because it does not operate under the control of the Communist Party as the KGB in the past. Moreover, the FSB leadership and their partners own the most important economic assets in the country and control the Russian government and the State Duma. According to Ion Mihai Pacepa,

In the Soviet Union, the KGB was a state within a state. Now former KGB officers are running the state. They have custody of the country’s 6,000 nuclear weapons, entrusted to the KGB in the 1950s, and they now also manage the strategic oil industry renationalized by Putin. The KGB successor, rechristened FSB, still has the right to electronically monitor the population, control political groups, search homes and businesses, infiltrate the federal government, create its own front enterprises, investigate cases, and run its own prison system. The Soviet Union had one KGB officer for every 428 citizens. Putin’s Russia has one FSB-ist for every 297 citizens.

However, the number of FSB staff is a state secret in Russia, and the staff of Russian Strategic Rocket Forces is not officially subordinate to the FSB, although the FSB is likely interested in monitoring these structures, as they inherently involve state secrets and various degrees of access to them. The Law on the Federal Security Service, which defines the FSB's functions and establishes its structure, does not mention these activities, but it is widely understood that the organization engages in these activities vigorously regardless.

A political scientist, Stanislav Belkovsky, also defines Chekism to be an "imperial ideology" that includes aggressive anti-Americanism.

Andrei Illarionov, a former advisor of Putin, describes contemporary Chekism as a new corporatism system, "distinct from any seen in our country before". In this model, members of the Corporation of Intelligence Service Collaborators [Russian abbreviation KSSS] took over the entire body of state power, follow an omerta-like behavior code, and "are given instruments conferring power over others – membership “perks”, such as the right to carry and use weapons". According to Illarionov, this "Corporation has seized key government agencies – the Tax Service, Ministry of Defense, Ministry of Foreign Affairs, Parliament, and the government-controlled mass media – which are now used to advance the interests of KSSS members. Through these agencies, every significant resource of the country – security/intelligence, political, economic, informational and financial – is being monopolized in the hands of Corporation members." The ideology of "Chekists" is "Nashism (“ours-ism”), the selective application of rights", he said.

== Attitudes toward Chekism in contemporary Russia ==
Chekists perceive themselves as a ruling class, with political powers transferred from one generation to another. A source cited that chekism created "mafiocracy" in Russia since it is part of corruption and criminality from the outset. Criminals were able to use the Chekist machinery to expand its power. According to a former FSB general, "A Chekist is a breed. ... A good KGB heritage—a father or grandfather, say, who worked for the service—is highly valued by today's siloviki. Marriages between siloviki clans are also encouraged".

The head of the Russian Drug Enforcement Administration Viktor Cherkesov said that all Russian siloviks must act as a united front: "We [Chekists] must stay together. We did not rush to power, we did not wish to appropriate the role of the ruling class. But the history commanded so that the weight of sustaining the Russian statehood fell to the large extent on our shoulders... There were no alternatives". Cherkesov also emphasized the importance of Chekism as a "hook" that keeps the entire country from falling apart: "Falling into the abyss the post-Soviet society caught the Chekist hook. And hanged on it.”

Political scientist Yevgenia Albats found such attitudes deplorable: "Throughout the country, without investigation or trial, the Chekists [of an earlier generation] raged. They tortured old men and raped schoolgirls and killed parents before the eyes of their children. They impaled people, beat them with an iron glove, put wet leather 'crowns' on their heads, buried them alive, locked them in cells where the floor was covered with corpses. Amazing, isn't it that today's agents do not blanch to call themselves Chekists, and proudly claim Dzerzhinsky's legacy?"

== See also ==
- Counterintelligence state
- Chronology of Soviet secret police agencies
- Police state
- Mitrokhin Archive (smuggled records of the KGB)
- Secret police
