= Pumpyansky =

Pumpyansky (Пумпянский) or Pumpyanskaya is a Russian surname. Notable people with the surname include:

- Aaron Elijah Pumpianski (1835–1893), Russian rabbi and author
- Dmitry Pumpyansky (born 1964), Russian billionaire businessman
- Seda Pumpyanskaya, Russian journalist and publicist
