= Counterintelligence state =

Form of government where state security services permeate society

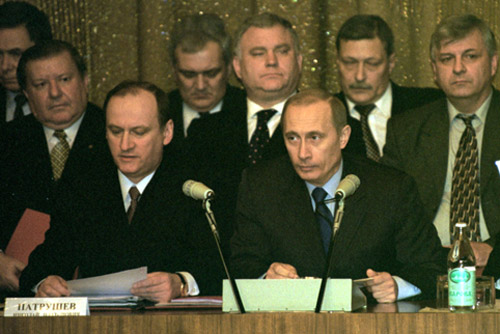
Russian President Vladimir Putin and then FSB director Nikolai Patrushev at a meeting of the board of the Federal Security Service in 2002

A counterintelligence state (sometimes also called intelligence state, securocracy or spookocracy) is a state where the state's security service penetrates and permeates all societal institutions, including the military. The term has been applied by historians and political commentators to the former Soviet Union, the former German Democratic Republic, Cuba after the 1959 revolution, Iraq under Saddam Hussein, China under the Chinese Communist Party (CCP), post-Soviet Russia under Vladimir Putin, especially since 2012, and the United States of America post-9/11.

According to one definition, "The counterintelligence state is characterized by the presence of a large, elite force acting as a watchdog of a security defined as broadly that the state must maintain an enormous vigilance and enforcement apparatus ... This apparatus is not accountable to the public and enjoys immense police powers ... Whether the civilian government is able to control the security bodies is an open question; indeed the civilian government is so penetrated by the apparatus that there is no clear distinction between the two."

In some cases, securocracies feature literal, direct rule of the state by officials originating from the secret police - as it was in the USSR under Lavrentiy Beria and Yuri Andropov, for instance, and as it is in Russia under Vladimir Putin.

== Soviet Union ==
There was a massive security apparatus in the Soviet Union to prevent any opposition, and "every facet of daily life fell into the KGB's domain".

Undercover staff of the KGB included three major categories:

- the active reserve
- the "trusted contacts" (or "reliable people")
- "civilian informers" (or "secret helpers")

The "active reserve" included KGB officers with a military rank who worked undercover. "Trusted contacts" were high placed civilians who collaborated with the KGB without signing any official working agreements, such as directors of personnel departments at various institutions, academics, deans, or writers and actors. Informers were citizens secretly recruited by the KGB, sometimes using forceful recruitment methods, such as blackmail. The precise number of people from various categories remains unknown, but one of the estimates was 11 million "informers" in the Soviet Union, or one out of every eighteen adult citizens.

== Russian Federation ==
A "Law on Foreign Intelligence" adopted in August 1992 provided conditions for penetration by former KGB officers to all levels of the government and economy, since it stipulated that "career personnel may occupy positions in ministries, departments, establishments, enterprises and organizations in accordance with the requirements of this law without compromising their association with foreign intelligence agencies". According to a Russian banker, "All big companies have to put people from the security services on the board of directors ... and we know that when Lubyanka calls, they have to answer them." A current FSB colonel explained that "We must make sure that companies don't make decisions that are not in the interest of the state".

Olga Kryshtanovskaya, director of the Moscow-based "Center for the Study of Elites", has found in the beginning of the 2000s that up to 78% of 1,016 leading political figures in post-Soviet Russia have served previously in organizations affiliated with the KGB or FSB. She said: "If in the Soviet period and the first post-Soviet period, the KGB and FSB people were mainly involved in security issues, now half are still involved in security but the other half are involved in business, political parties, NGOs, regional governments, even culture. They started to use all political institutions."

Political scholar Julie Anderson describes how under the presidency of Vladimir Putin, himself a former KGB operative, "an 'FSB State' composed of chekists has been established and is consolidating its hold on the country. Its closest partners are organized criminals. In a world marked by a globalized economy and information infrastructure, and with transnational terrorism groups utilizing all available means to achieve their goals and further their interests, Russian intelligence collaboration with these elements is potentially disastrous."

Historian Yuri Felshtinsky compared the takeover of Russian state by siloviks with an imaginary scenario of the Gestapo coming to power in Germany after World War II. He noted a fundamental difference between the secret police and ordinary political parties, even totalitarian ones, such as the Soviet Communist Party. The Russian secret police organizations use various violent active measures. Hence, according to Felshtinsky, they killed Alexander Litvinenko and directed Russian apartment bombings and other terrorism acts in Russia to frighten the civilian population and achieve their political objectives.

Former KGB officer Konstantin Preobrazhenskiy shares similar ideas. When asked "How many people in Russia work in FSB?", he replied: "Whole country. FSB owns everything, including Russian Army and even own Church, the Russian Orthodox Church ... Putin managed to create a new social system in Russia".

Intelligence expert Marc Gerecht describes Vladimir Putin's Russia as "a new phenomenon in Europe: a state defined and dominated by former and active-duty security and intelligence officers. Not even Fascist Italy, Nazi Germany, or the Soviet Union – all undoubtedly much worse creations than Putin's government – were as top-heavy with intelligence talent."

== People's Republic of China ==
China contains many of the hallmarks of a counterintelligence state, with an intelligence security apparatus unprecedented in both scale and sophistication. Traditionally considered a "hard target" nation by the US intelligence community, the use of mass surveillance against its domestic population and intrusive collection of personal information from telecommunications to travel, flight, hotel check-in and internet browsing data has made it challenging for US intelligence agencies to collect information on developments within the country. The human intelligence (HUMINT) model of intelligence collection has been remarked as obsolete as a result of development of technology such as facial recognition, biometrics, wifi sniffers and pervasive use of CCTV cameras making it: "all but impossible" to disguise human operatives from official scrutiny. Political commentary has also focused on the extremely closed nature of the general secretaryship of Xi Jinping, with Richard McGregor of the Lowy Institute describing the CCP's culture as one of "radical secrecy".

China may be the first government to combine authoritarian ambitions with cutting edge technical capability. It’s like the surveillance nightmare of East Germany combined with the tech of Silicon Valley. — Director of the FBI Christopher Wray, Countering Threats Posed by the Chinese Government Inside the U.S., Remarks at Ronald Reagan Presidential Library and Museum, January 21, 2022)

In an address on April 14, 2022 to the Georgia Institute of Technology, CIA Director William Burns expanded on the issue of "ubiquitous technical surveillance" in countries such as China and the challenge such issues posed to US intelligence collection on the PRC, stating:

The People’s Republic of China is a formidable competitor, lacking in neither ambition nor capability. It seeks to overtake us in literally every domain, from economic strength to military power, and from space to cyber space. Its rise has been remarkable. In the last few years, Beijing has hacked at least 150 U.S. companies to steal secrets. It is trying to increase its nuclear arsenal to 1000 warheads. It has detained 1 million of its own citizens simply because they are Muslim, and arrested thousands more in Hong Kong for peacefully supporting democracy. And it has lured countless countries into crushing debt, data-exposure and democratic backsliding. The People’s Republic of China is intent upon building the capabilities to bully its neighbors, replace the United States as the preeminent power in the Indo-Pacific, and chip away with other authoritarians at the rules-based international order that we and our allies have worked so hard to sustain. As an intelligence service, we have never had to deal with an adversary with more reach in more domains. — CIA Director William Burns, Remarks at Georgia Institute of Technology (April 14, 2022)

An article published in Foreign Policy on April 27, 2019, by British security specialist Edward Lucas, also made significant reference to China and its use of technology for counter-intelligence purposes, stating, "The cloak of anonymity [for Western intelligence agencies] is steadily shrinking" and additionally that "closed societies now have the edge over open ones. It has become harder for Western countries to spy on places such as China, Iran, and Russia and easier for those countries' intelligence services to spy on the rest of the world".

== United States ==
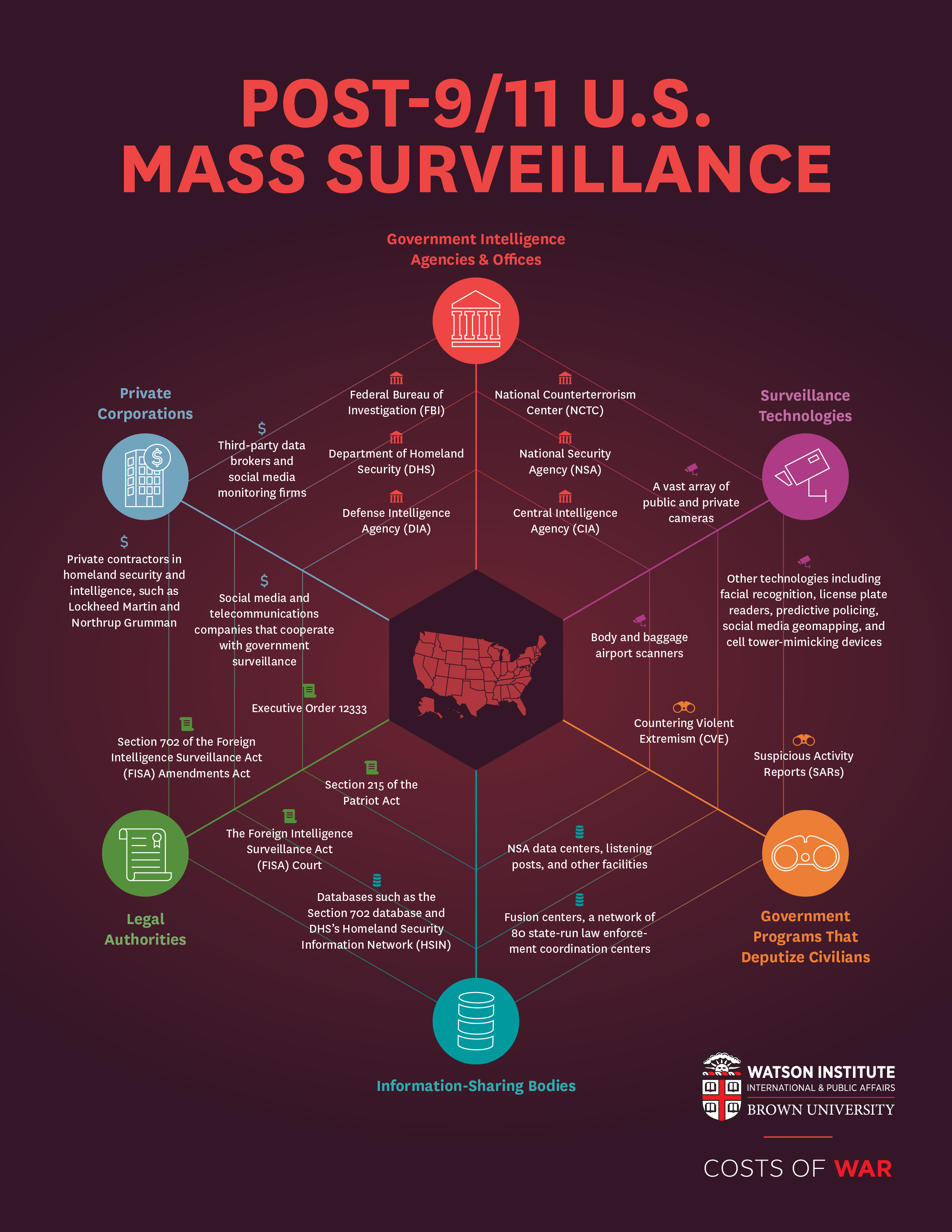
The extent of U.S. mass surveillance after 9/11

Intelligence failures in the lead up to the September 11 terrorist attacks prompted the United States Congress to pass the PATRIOT Act that provided sweeping powers for communications surveillance. In addition to the PATRIOT Act, Congress established the Department of Homeland Security (DHS). The 22 departments and agencies combined under the DHS engaged in intelligence sharing, and agencies like the FBI, CIA and Department of Justice have seen their surveillance capabilities expanded. "Mass surveillance" in the United States involves federal agencies, local police, private companies, and members of the public. Federal agencies obtain data from private companies and track American citizens using facial recognition, social media geomapping and other technologies. These expanding, freedom-eroding programs particularly target Muslims, immigrants and protesters for social and legal justice. The existing legal framework today allows the United States government to amass sensitive data without any suspicion of wrongdoing.

== See also ==
- Deep state
- Grassroots dictatorship
- Police state
