= Mark Galeotti =

British political scientist, lecturer, writer, and businessman

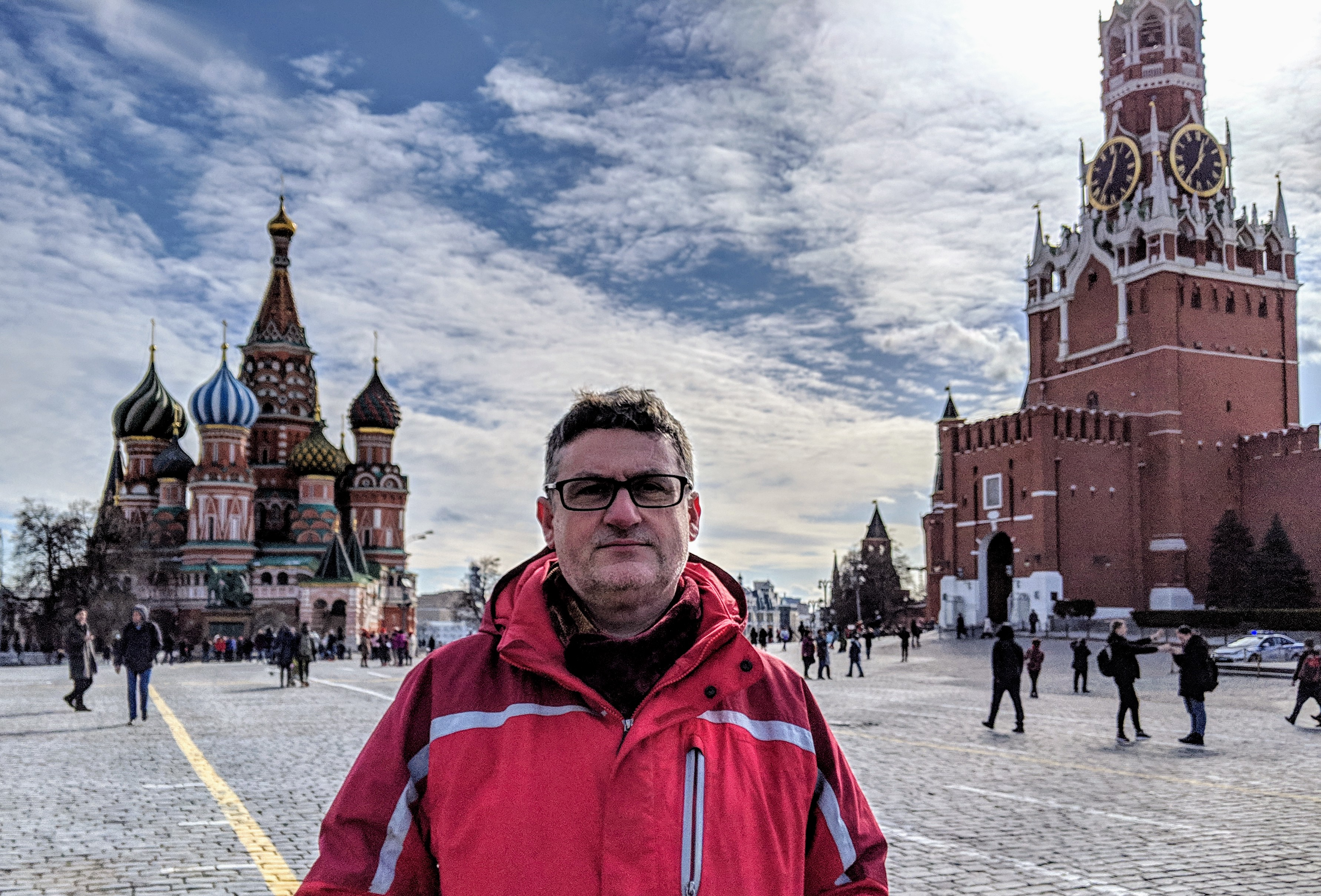
- Galeotti in 2019
- Born: 15 October 1965 (age 61); Kingston upon Thames, England
- Education: Tiffin School; London School of Economics
- Occupations: Journalist; historian; writer
- Employer(s): UCL School of Slavonic and East European Studies; Institute of International Relations Prague

Mark Galeotti (born 15 October 1965) is a British historian, lecturer and writer on transnational crime and Russian security affairs and director of the consultancy Mayak Intelligence. He is an honorary professor at the UCL School of Slavonic and East European Studies, and an associate fellow in Euro-Atlantic geopolitics at the Council on Geostrategy, as well as formerly a senior associate fellow at the Royal United Services Institute.

== Education, career ==
Born in Kingston upon Thames, England, Galeotti was educated at Tiffin School (grammar academy) in Kingston upon Thames and Robinson College, Cambridge, where he studied history. He then switched to the London School of Economics and completed his doctorate, supervised by Dominic Lieven, on the impact of the Afghan war on the USSR.

He was a senior researcher at the Institute of International Relations Prague and head of its Centre for European Security. He remains a senior non-resident fellow with the IIR. Before moving to Prague, he was clinical professor of global affairs at the Center for Global Affairs at New York University. Before moving to NYU, he was head of the history department at Keele University, visiting professor of public security at the School of Criminal Justice at Rutgers–Newark (2005-6) and senior research fellow at the Foreign and Commonwealth Office (1996–97). He has also been a visiting professor at MGIMO (Moscow) and Charles University (Prague). For the academic year 2018–19 he was a Jean Monnet Fellow at the European University Institute.

On 14 June 2022, Galeotti was among 29 people from the United Kingdom banned by the Russian government from travelling to Russia.

=== Journalism and other pursuits ===
Between 1991 and 2006, he wrote a monthly column on Russian and post-Soviet security issues for Jane's Intelligence Review (formerly Jane’s Soviet Intelligence Review). He continues to write for various Jane's publications, as well as Oxford Analytica, for which he covers Russian security, transnational crime and terrorism issues. In July 2011, he started writing a regular column, Siloviks & Scoundrels, for the Russian newspaper The Moscow News, until the newspaper's closure in 2014. Since the start of the Ukraine War he has written regularly for The Spectator and Sunday Times and was sanctioned by Russia largely on the basis of these publications.

He writes on his own blog, In Moscow's Shadows as well as guest writing for Raam op Rusland, EUROPP, oD:Russia, the International Policy Digest, and other blogs. He also contributes articles to The Moscow Times and War on the Rocks and is a contributing editor to Business New Europe. He runs a podcast, which is also called In Moscow's Shadows.

He is the founding editor of the journal Global Crime. He is also a member of the international advisory board of the Mob Museum.

He has also worked on several Glorantha-related books and fanzines. and wrote the Hero Quest-engined standalone RPG Mythic Russia. He is also the author of 1991's Cyberpunk 2020 RPG expansion guidebook Eurosource.

== Books ==
- Homo Criminalis: how crime organises the world, 2025 (London: Ebury)
- Forged in War: a military history of Russia from its beginnings to today, 2024 (London: Osprey)
- Downfall: Putin, Prigozhin and the new fight for the future of Russia, 2024 (London: Ebury), with Anna Arutunyan
- The Weaponisation of Everything: A Field Guide to the New Way of War, 2022 (New Haven and London: Yale University Press)
- Putin’s Wars: From Chechnya to Ukraine, 2022 (Oxford: Osprey Publishing)
- A Short History of Russia, 2020 (New York: Hanover Square) and 2021 (London: Ebury)
- Armies of Russia's War in Ukraine, 2019. (London: Osprey)
- We Need to Talk About Putin, 2019. (London: Ebury)
- Russian Political Warfare: moving beyond the hybrid, 2019. (London: Routledge)
- Kulikovo 1380: the battle that made Russia, 2019 (London: Osprey)
- The Vory: Russia’s super mafia (in Russian), 2018 (London and New Haven: Yale University Press) – also licensed for translation in 11 other languages, to date. Simon Sebag Montefiore described it as a "brilliant, gripping, astonishingly rich, important book".
- The Modern Russian Army, 1992-2016, 2017. (London: Osprey) – also published in Polish and Italian
- Hybrid War or Gibridnaya Voina? Getting Russia’s non-linear military challenge right, 2016. (Prague: Mayak)
- Spetsnaz: Russia’s special forces, 2015. (London: Osprey) – also published in Swedish
- Russia’s Chechen Wars, 2014. (London: Osprey) – also published in Romanian
- Galeotti, Mark (2013). Russian Security and Paramilitary Forces since 1991. London: Osprey. ISBN 9781780961057.
- Paths of Wickedness and Crime: the underworlds of the Renaissance Italian city, 2012. (New York: Gonfalone)
- The Politics of Security in Modern Russia [edited], 2010. (London: Ashgate)
- Organised Crime in History [edited], 2009. (London: Routledge)
- Global Crime Today: the changing face of organised crime [edited], 2005. (London: Routledge)
- Criminal Russia: a sourcebook and coursebook on 150 years of crime, corruption & policing, 2003. (Keele, ORECRU, revised 4th edition)
- Russian and Post-Soviet Organized Crime [edited], 2002. (London, Ashgate)
- Putin's Russia [edited], 2002 (London, Jane's), co-edited with Ian Synge
- Gorbachev and his Revolution (Basingstoke, Macmillan, 1997). Elements of this book were republished within People Who Made History: Mikhail Gorbachev, edited by Tom Head (New York, Gale: 2003)
- Jane’s Sentinel: Russia (Coulsdon, Jane’s, 1997)
- Unstable Russia (Coulsdon, Jane’s, 1996)
- The Age of Anxiety. Security and Politics in Soviet and Post-Soviet Russia (Harlow, Longman Higher Academic, 1995). Translated into Czech as Čas Úzkosti (Prague, Orbis, 1998)
- Afghanistan: the Soviet Union's last war (London, Frank Cass, 1995, new edition released in paperback 2001)
- The Kremlin’s Agenda (Coulsdon, Jane’s Information Group, 1995)
