= Seda Pumpyanskaya =

Russian journalist and publicist

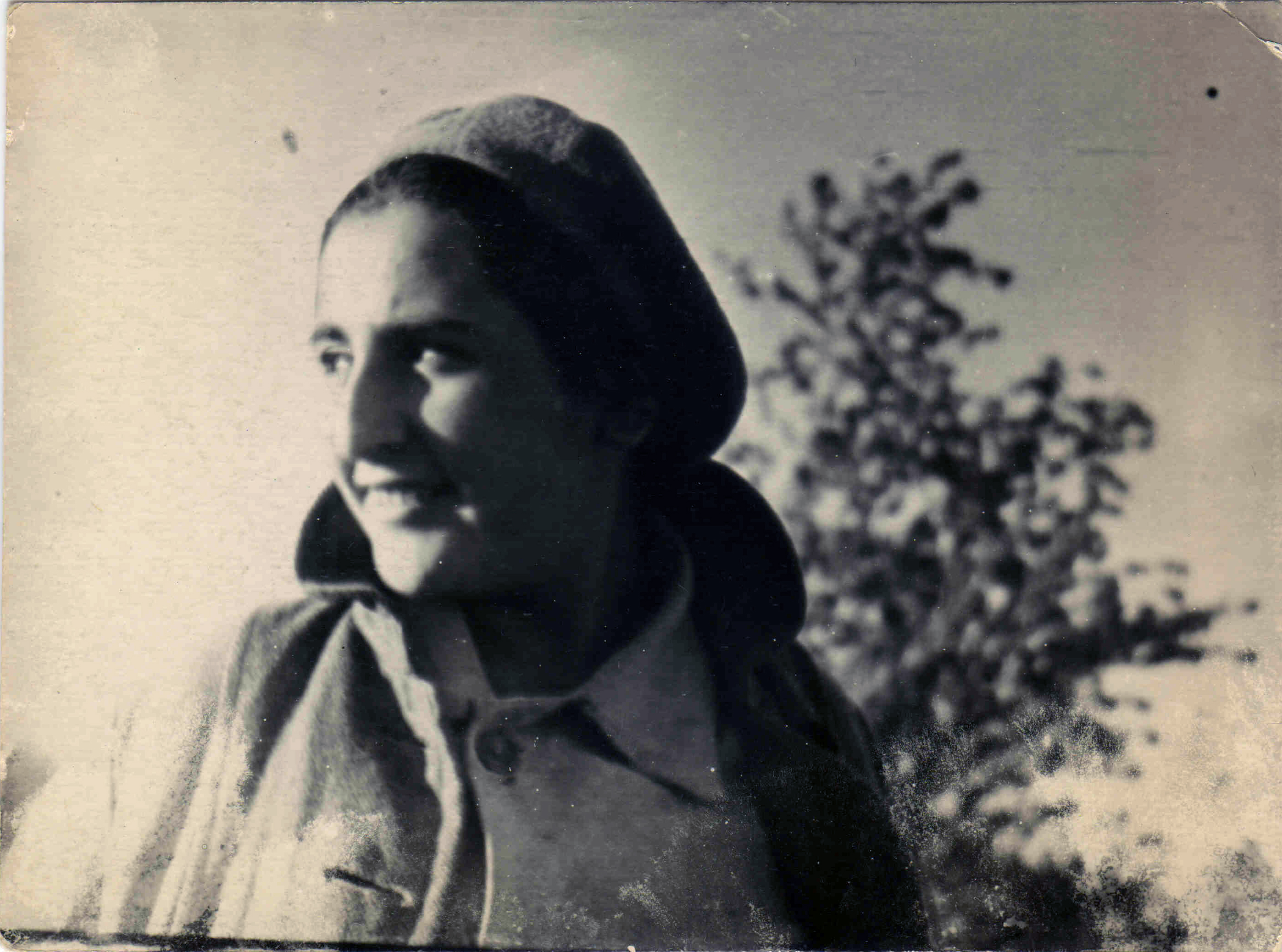
Pumpyanskaya

Seda Pumpyanskaya is an international communications director and publicist. She has latterly served as the United Nations Director of Strategic Communications. Before that she has served as the Director of Communications and then Senior Adviser on Communications and Outreach at the Council of Europe. She was also the Vice President of the Skolkovo Foundation.

Pumpyanskaya is a daughter of Russian journalist Alexander Pumpyansky, and was educated at Moscow State University, followed by a year of studies at Harvard University as a Nieman Fellow.

From 2005 to 2010, she was the Council of Europe’s Director of Communication under then-Secretary General Rt. Hon. Terry Davis, also serving as a Member of the Executive Board.

From 1999 to 2004, she held several executive positions in public affairs and communications with the United Nations, working in Guatemala, Kosovo, and Bosnia and Herzegovina.

Before joining the United Nations, Pumpyanskaya was a journalist and worked with some media in Moscow, including The New Times and Russian Newsweek. From 1991 to 1996, she was Moscow bureau's Staff Correspondent for Spanish newspaper El País. She also worked for the BBC in London from 1996 to 1997, where she was involved in making a documentary on Mikhail Gorbachev and worked on a special feature on Pope John Paul II, as well as other topics for the BBC’s 'Correspondent' programme. In 1995, she worked for Radio Free Europe in Prague.

Pumpyanskaya is a member the European Association of Communication Directors. She participates in media events, networking with policymakers and media executives, including those organised by the World Association of Newspapers.
