= Yaroslav Golovanov =

Soviet Russian aerospace journalist and writer

Yaroslav Golovanov

Yaroslav Kirillovich Golovanov (Russian: Ярослав Кириллович Голованов; 2 June 1932 in Moscow – 21 May 2003 in Peredelkino) was a Russian journalist, writer and science communicator. He covered space exploration by the Soviet Union from its beginnings.

Golovanov's father was director of a theatre (today's Gogol's Theatre). His mother was an actress.

Golovanov studied rocket engineering at the Bauman Moscow State Technical University, finishing in 1957(?). During 1956-58 he worked in a laboratory of the Ministry of Aviation Industry. In September 1957 he started to write for the science department of the daily Komsomolskaya Pravda, working there as an editor from February 1958. From 1968 to 2003 he was an independent contributor of the newspaper.

Golovanov soon specialized in space exploration. The first novel "Кузнецы грома" (Thunder's Blacksmiths) deals with the lives of Soviet rocket designers.

Between 1965 and 1966 Golovanov was a member of a team of three journalists, unofficial candidates for a space flight. The team was disbanded after Korolyov's death. (Golovanov tried, in vain, to become a cosmonaut in the early 1990s.)

In 1982 he published "Дорога на космодром" (Doroga na kosmodrom, The Path to Cosmodrome), a detailed overview of the history of space exploration, mainly in the Soviet Union. His detailed biography of Korolyov was published in 1994 under name "Королев. Факты и мифы" (Korolyov - facts and myths). Golovanov's diary of fifty years was published in 1998-99 under the title "Заметки вашего современника" (Notes from Your Contemporary).

In total, Yaroslav Golovanov published 20 books, which were translated into 25 languages.

Golovanov was married three times: to Valentina Alekseyevna Zhuravleva [with sons Vasily (born 1960) and Aleksandr (born 1965)], to Natalija Borisovna Laskin with son, Dmitri (born 1974) and to Yevgenia Markovna Albats [with daughter Olga (born 1988)].

== Trivia ==
- Dmitri Bilenkin, Agranovsky, Yaroslav Golovanov, Komarov, and an artist Pavel Bunin used the collective pseudonym Pavel Bagryak for some of their works.
