= Deep state =

Covert government networks

Deep state are covert networks of power operating within a government but independent of its political leadership, in pursuit of their own agendas and goals. In popular usage, the term carries overwhelmingly negative connotations and is often associated with conspiracy theories.

Although the term originated in Turkey ("Derin Devlet"), various interpretations of the concept have emerged in other national contexts. In some, "deep state" is used to refer to perceived shadowy conspiracies, while in others it describes concerns about the enduring influence of military, intelligence, and bureaucratic institutions on democratic governance. In many cases, the perception of a deep state is shaped by historical events, political struggles, and the balance of power within government institutions.

The use of the term has expanded beyond political science into popular culture, journalism and conspiracy theories, reflecting a broad range of beliefs about hidden networks of power operating behind the scenes. Particularly after the 2016 United States presidential election, deep state became much more widely used as a pejorative term after the conspiracy theory in the United States was promoted by both conservative-leaning media outlets and the first Donald Trump administration.

== Etymology ==
The term "deep state" is a direct calque of the Turkish phrase derin devlet (lit. 'deep state'). It originally emerged in Turkey to describe an alleged network of military, intelligence, and bureaucratic elements operating independently of elected officials to maintain a particular ideological or political status quo.

While the exact origins of the term are debated, some historians suggest that the concept of a "deep state" in Turkey dates back to the early years of the republic, referring to informal power structures within the military and bureaucracy. Others argue that the modern interpretation is more closely tied to the Cold War era, when covert operations were conducted to prevent political instability and counter Soviet influence.

The idea of a "deep state" is not exclusive to Turkey. Many countries have had similar concepts describing secretive power structures operating behind the scenes. Although the terminology varies, the idea often refers to military, intelligence, or bureaucratic networks that exert control beyond the reach of democratic institutions.

== Philosophical and literary perspectives ==
Throughout history, intellectuals and writers have explored concerns related to hidden power structures operating beyond public accountability. The German Enlightenment thinker Christoph Martin Wieland addressed these themes in his 1788 work The Secret of the Order of Cosmopolitans. Wieland speculated on how secret organizations, often claiming to work in the public interest, might instead become a state within a state, subverting legitimate political institutions.

His work reflects broader Enlightenment-era concerns about the influence of clandestine societies on governance. While Wieland did not advocate conspiracy theories, he critically examined the tension between secret power structures and public accountability. This notion remains central to modern discussions of the so-called Deep state.

== By country ==
=== China ===
The journalist Emily Feng and the academics Michael Bonnin and Minxin Pei have noted parallels between the way Chairman Mao Zedong perceived civil servants "taking the capitalist road" and the way the Trump administration perceives the deep state.

=== Egypt ===
The concept of a deep state in Egypt is frequently associated with the powerful military and intelligence apparatus that has historically influenced the country's political landscape, since 1952. Following the 2011 Egyptian revolution and the rise of the Muslim Brotherhood, opposition figures accused elements within the military and bureaucracy of working to undermine the elected government. The 2013 military coup led by Abdel Fattah el-Sisi was seen by many as an example of the deep state's enduring power in Egypt, ensuring that military and intelligence agencies retained control over key aspects of governance.

In 2013, author Abdul-Azim Ahmed wrote the deep state was being used to refer to Egyptian military/security networks, headed by the Supreme Council of the Armed Forces after the 2011 Egyptian revolution, basically remnants of the former regime who are combatting the democratic transition. They are "non-democratic leaders within a country" whose power is "independent of any political changes that take place". They are "often hidden beneath layers of bureaucracy" and may not be "in complete control at all times" but have "tangible control of key resources (whether human or financial)". He also wrote: "The 'deep state' is beginning to become short hand for the embedded anti-democratic power structures within a government, something very few democracies can claim to be free from."

=== Israel ===
In Israel, Prime Minister Benjamin Netanyahu has raised conspiracy theories about a deep state seeking to undermine his government. In May 2020, an article in Haaretz describes how people meeting Netanyahu "have heard lengthy speeches [...] that even though he has been elected repeatedly, in reality, the country is controlled by a 'deep state.'" Netanyahu claimed that his trial on charges of corrupt relations with his friend Arnon Milchan was created by the 'Deep State', and that the fact that then-Finance Minister Yair Lapid was not indicted despite being a friend of Milchan also is proof of the existence of a deep state in Israel.

=== India ===
In India, since independence the widespread consensus is that the network of Indian Administrative Service officers are considered the deep state.

During 2004-2014 India, National Advisory Council (NAC) has been described as a deep state entity. NAC was an advisory body set up by the first United Progressive Alliance (UPA) government in 2004 to advise the Prime Minister of India, Manmohan Singh. Sonia Gandhi served as its chairperson for much of the tenure of the UPA. Its aim was to assist the Prime Minister in achieving and monitoring missions and goals. It was dissolved in 2014. The concept of a NAC has been criticized by opposition parties and some scholars as not being in keeping with India's constitution, describing it as an alternative cabinet. The NAC was also accused of exercising an outsized influence over the central government.

=== Italy ===
In Italy, the concept of a deep state is often linked to Il Sistema, referring to covert networks within the intelligence services, military, and even organized crime groups such as the Mafia. During the Cold War, Italy was a focal point of Operation Gladio, a clandestine NATO-backed effort to prevent communist influence. The existence of secretive paramilitary networks and their involvement in political manipulation and assassinations has fueled the idea of a deep state operating in Italy.

The most famous case is Propaganda Due. Propaganda Due (better known as P2) was a Masonic lodge belonging to the Grand Orient of Italy (GOI). It was founded in 1877 with the name of Masonic Propaganda, in the period of its management by the entrepreneur Licio Gelli it assumed deviated forms with respect to the statutes of the Freemasonry and became subversive towards the Italian legal order. The P2 was suspended by the GOI on 26 July 1976; subsequently, the parliamentary commission of inquiry into the P2 Masonic lodge under the presidency of Minister Tina Anselmi concluded the P2 case by denouncing the lodge as a real "criminal organization" and "subversive". It was dissolved with a special law, the n. 17 of 25 January 1982.

=== Middle East & North Africa ===
Journalist Robert F. Worth argues that the term deep state is "just as apt" for networks in many states in the Middle East where governments have colluded with smugglers and jihadis (Syria), jihadi veterans of the Soviet–Afghan War (Yemen), and other criminals working as irregular forces (Egypt and Algeria). In From Deep State to Islamic State, Jean-Pierre Filiu describes a hard core of regimes in Syria, Egypt, and Yemen that staged successful counter-revolutions against the Arab Spring in those countries, comparing them with the Mamluks of Egypt and the Levant from 1250 to 1517 in that they proclaim themselves servants of the putative rulers while actually ruling themselves.

=== Pakistan ===
In Pakistan, the term "deep state" is commonly used to describe the powerful role of the military and intelligence services, particularly the Inter-Services Intelligence (ISI), in shaping domestic and foreign policy. The Pakistani deep state has been accused of influencing elections, controlling media narratives, and supporting militant groups to maintain strategic interests in the region, particularly in relation to Afghanistan and India. The concept has been a recurring theme in Pakistani politics, with civilian governments often facing challenges from entrenched security institutions.

Since independence, the Pakistan Armed Forces have always had a huge influence in the country's politics as a national security institutions. In addition to the decades of direct rule by the military government, the military also has many constraints on the power of the elected prime ministers, and also has been accused of being a deep state. The Pakistan Army is often referred to as "The Establishment" due to its deep involvement in the country's decision-making processes specifically the foreign affairs.

=== Russia ===
In Russia, the idea of a deep state aligns with the concept of the "siloviki" (силовики), a term referring to individuals from military, intelligence, and security backgrounds who exert influence over the government. The siloviki, often former members of the KGB and later the FSB, have been viewed as a key force in shaping Russian politics, particularly under the leadership of Vladimir Putin. Their role in decision-making, foreign policy, and economic affairs has led some analysts to describe Russia as having a deep state where security services and oligarchs play a crucial role in governance.

=== Turkey ===
According to the Journalist Robert F. Worth, "The expression 'deep state' had originated in Turkey in the 1990s, where the military colluded with drug traffickers and hit men to wage a dirty war against Kurdish insurgents". Professor Ryan Gingeras wrote that the Turkish term derin devlet "colloquially speaking" refers to "'criminal' or 'rogue' elements that have somehow muscled their way into power". The journalist Dexter Filkins wrote of a "presumed clandestine network" of Turkish "military officers and their civilian allies" who, for decades, "suppressed and sometimes murdered dissidents, Communists, reporters, Islamists, Christian missionaries, and members of minority groups—anyone thought to pose a threat to the secular order". Journalist Hugh Roberts has described the "shady nexus" between the police and intelligence services, "certain politicians and organised crime", whose members believe they are authorised "to get up to all sorts of unavowable things" because they are "custodians of the higher interests of the nation".

=== United Kingdom ===
In the United Kingdom, the Civil Service has been called a deep state by senior politicians. In 2018, Steve Hilton, then advisor to David Cameron, claimed Tony Blair had said: "You cannot underestimate how much they believe it's their job to actually run the country and to resist the changes put forward by people they dismiss as 'here today, gone tomorrow' politicians. They genuinely see themselves as the true guardians of the national interest, and think that their job is simply to wear you down and wait you out." The British comedy series Yes Minister paints the conflict of the civil servant and the politician in charge in a humorous way.

In February 2024, former Conservative Prime Minister Liz Truss claimed that she was forced out of office by the 'deep state' during an appearance at that year's Conservative Political Action Conference in the US. This statement was criticised within her own party and by the opposition, with both Labour Party Shadow Paymaster General Jonathan Ashworth and the Liberal Democrats Deputy Leader Daisy Cooper referring to it as a "conspiracy theory".

=== United States ===
The concept's use in the United States of America dates back to at least 1963. The term has been used to describe "a hybrid association of government elements and parts of top-level industry and finance that is effectively able to govern the United States without reference to the consent of the governed as expressed through the formal political process." Events such as the Watergate scandal, COINTELPRO, and post-9/11 intelligence operations have been linked to discussions of the deep state.

In the United States, the term "deep state" gained popularity in the 21st century, particularly in political discourse. It is often used to suggest that unelected government officials, particularly within the intelligence community, law enforcement, and military, work to undermine elected leaders or shape policy in ways that contradict democratic governance. The term has been associated with conspiracy theories as well as with legitimate concerns about the influence of entrenched bureaucracies and intelligence agencies.

Intelligence agencies such as the CIA have been accused by elements of the Donald Trump administration of attempting to thwart its policy goals. Writing for The New York Times, the analyst Issandr El Amani warned against the "growing discord between a president and his bureaucratic rank-and-file", while analysts of the column The Interpreter wrote:

Though the deep state is sometimes discussed as a shadowy conspiracy, it helps to think of it instead as a political conflict between a nation's leader and its governing institutions.

— Amanda Taub and Max Fisher, The Interpreter

According to the political commentator David Gergen, quoted by Time in early 2017, the term had been used by Steve Bannon, Breitbart News, and other supporters of the Trump administration in order to delegitimize critics of the Trump presidency. In February 2017, the deep state theory was dismissed by authors for The New York Times, as well as The New York Observer. In October 2019 The New York Times gave credence to the general idea by publishing an opinion piece arguing that the deep state in the Civil Service was created to "battle people like Trump". Trump's warnings about a deep state have been referred to as "repeating a longtime [John Birch Society] talking point". American political scientist Francis Fukuyama has cited America's long-term competition with China as a reason to defend the American deep state.

Scholars have generally disputed the notion that the U.S. Executive Branch bureaucracy represents a true deep state as the term is formally understood but have taken a range of views on the role of that bureaucracy in constraining or empowering the U.S. president.

In March 2025, Israeli Prime Minister Benjamin Netanyahu posted on his official X account "In America and in Israel, when a strong right wing leader wins an election, the leftist Deep State weaponized the justice system to thwart the peoples will. …" Elon Musk responded with a "100" emoji. Shortly afterwards, Netanyahu deleted the post from his official account and reposted on his personal account.

=== Venezuela ===
The Cartel of the Suns, a purported group of high-ranking officials within the Bolivarian government of Venezuela, has been described as "a series of often competing networks buried deep within the Chavista regime". Following the Bolivarian Revolution, it is alleged, the Bolivarian government initially embezzled until there were no more funds to embezzle, which required them to turn to drug trafficking. President Hugo Chávez is supposed to have made partnerships with the Colombian leftist militia Revolutionary Armed Forces of Colombia (FARC) and his successor Nicolás Maduro is said to have continued the process, promoting officials to high-ranking positions after they were accused of drug trafficking.

=== Other alleged cases ===
- Imperial Brazil's Diretório Monárquico do Brasil and Black Guard
- India's Rashtriya Swayamsevak Sangh
- Indonesia's Kopassus
- Kingdom of Serbia's Black Hand
- Morocco's Makhzen
- Pakistan's Intelligence Community: ISI, FIA, NAB, and/or IB
- Serbia and Montenegro's RDB
- Spain's Grupos Antiterroristas de Liberación, "Antiterrorist Liberation Groups"
- Thailand's Military-Monarchy Nexus or Network Monarchy
- United Kingdom's City of London Corporation

== See also ==
- Cabal
- Counterintelligence state
- Dual power
- Éminence grise
- Fifth column
- Fourth branch of government
- Parallel state
- Power behind the throne
- Proto-state
- Puppet government
- Shadow government (conspiracy theory)
- Synarchism, a term for a deep state used by French and Spanish speakers
