= Šarūnas Gustainis =

Lithuanian businessman and politician

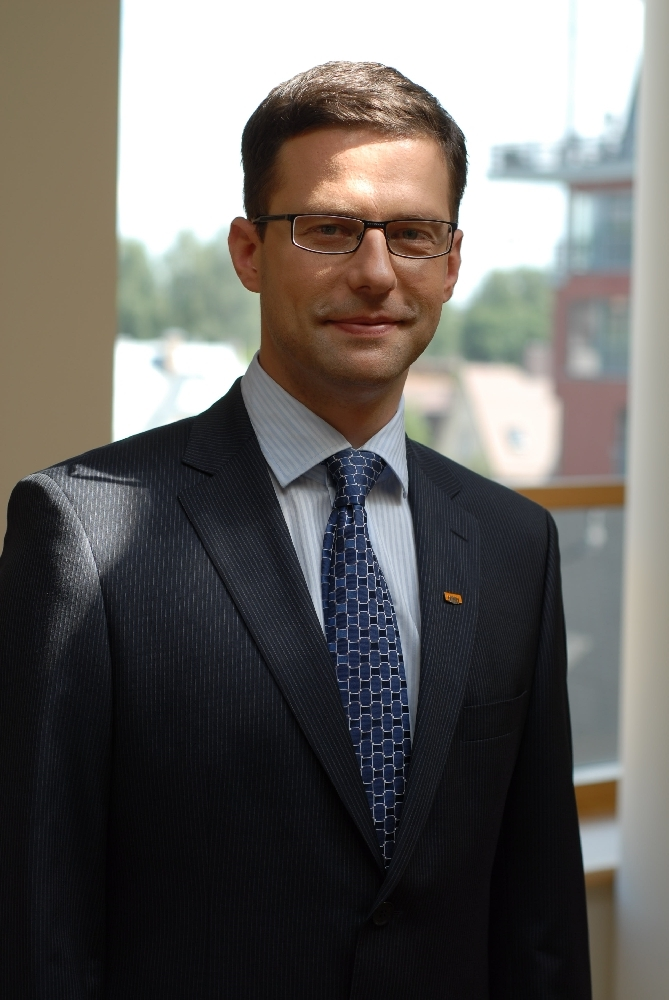
Gustanis

Šarūnas Gustainis (born 15 December 1975 in Kaunas) is a Lithuanian businessman and politician, who was a member of the Seimas from 2012 to 2016.

In 2010 he co-founded an independent public institution - the Institute of Applied Politics (Lithuanian: Taikomosios politikos institutas), a non-profit, private, free people public institution engaged in various social, cultural, educational, etc. activities.
