= The New Times (magazine) =

Russian-language magazine

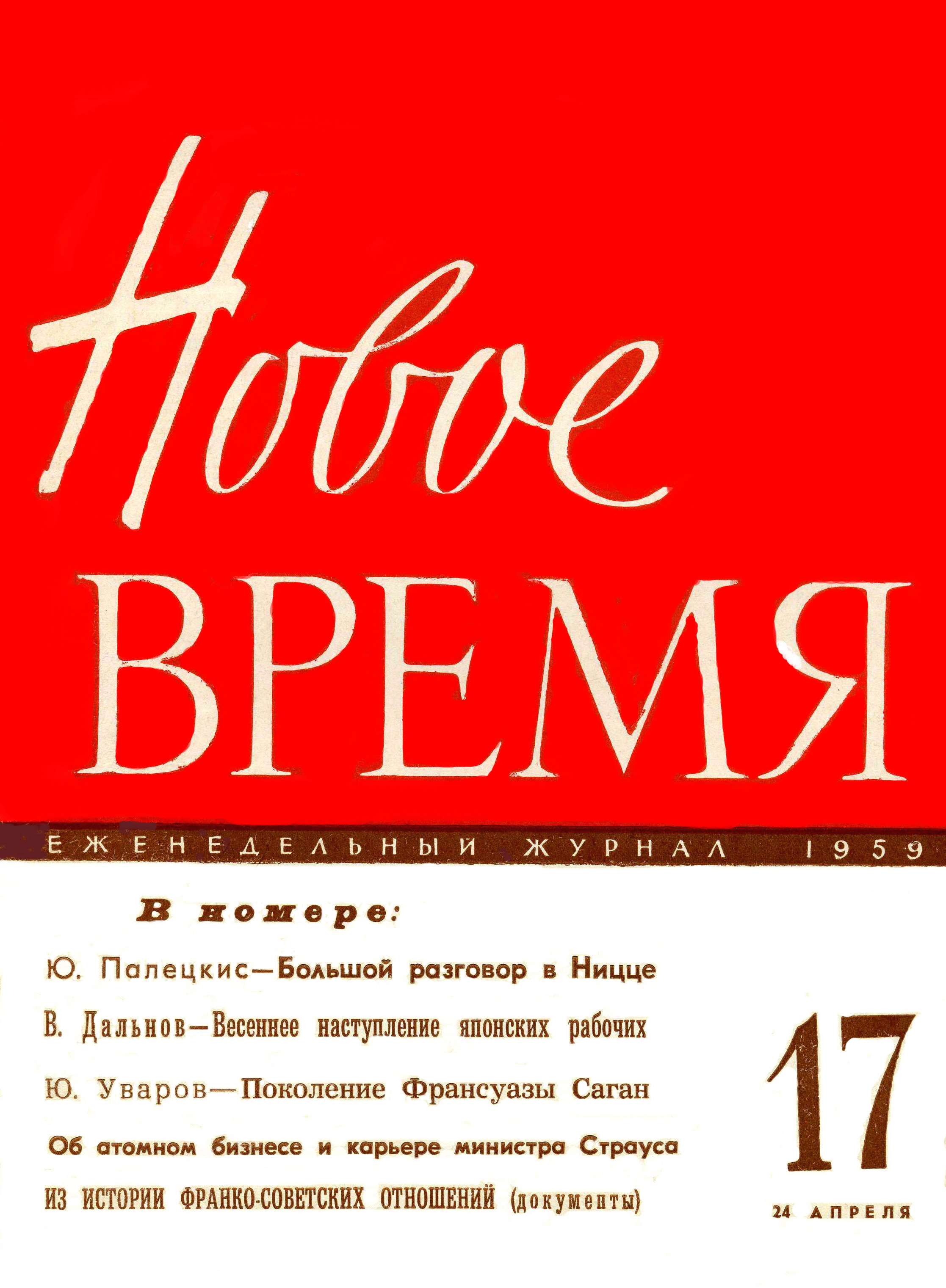
- Cover of the magazine issued on 24 April 1959
- Editor: Yevgenia Albats
- Categories: online news and political magazine
- Frequency: weekly
- Founded: 1943
- Country: USSR, Russia
- Based in: Moscow
- Language: Russian
- Website: newtimes.ru

The New Times (Russian: «Новое Время», romanized: Novoe Vremya) is a Russian language magazine in Russia. The magazine was founded in 1943. The magazine is a liberal, independent Russian weekly news magazine, publishing for Russia and Armenia. (During the Soviet times it was a multi-language political magazine which followed the official party line.) Its chief editor is Russian investigative journalist, political scientist, writer and radio host Yevgenia Albats.

The magazine contains articles on politics, economics, social life and journalist investigations. Columnists provide the readers with their opinions regarding recent news and events.

== History ==
In 2017 the magazine ceased its print publication and became an online-only publication.

After an interview of Yevgenia Albats with opposition politician Alexei Navalny, aired on Echo of Moscow, The New Times faced a 22 million ruble fine in October 2018. The fine amount (almost $370,000) was crowd-funded in four days.

On 28 February 2022, Roskomnadzor blocked the website of the magazine for its coverage of the Russian invasion of Ukraine. Editor Yevgenia Albats fled Russia in September to avoid persecution.

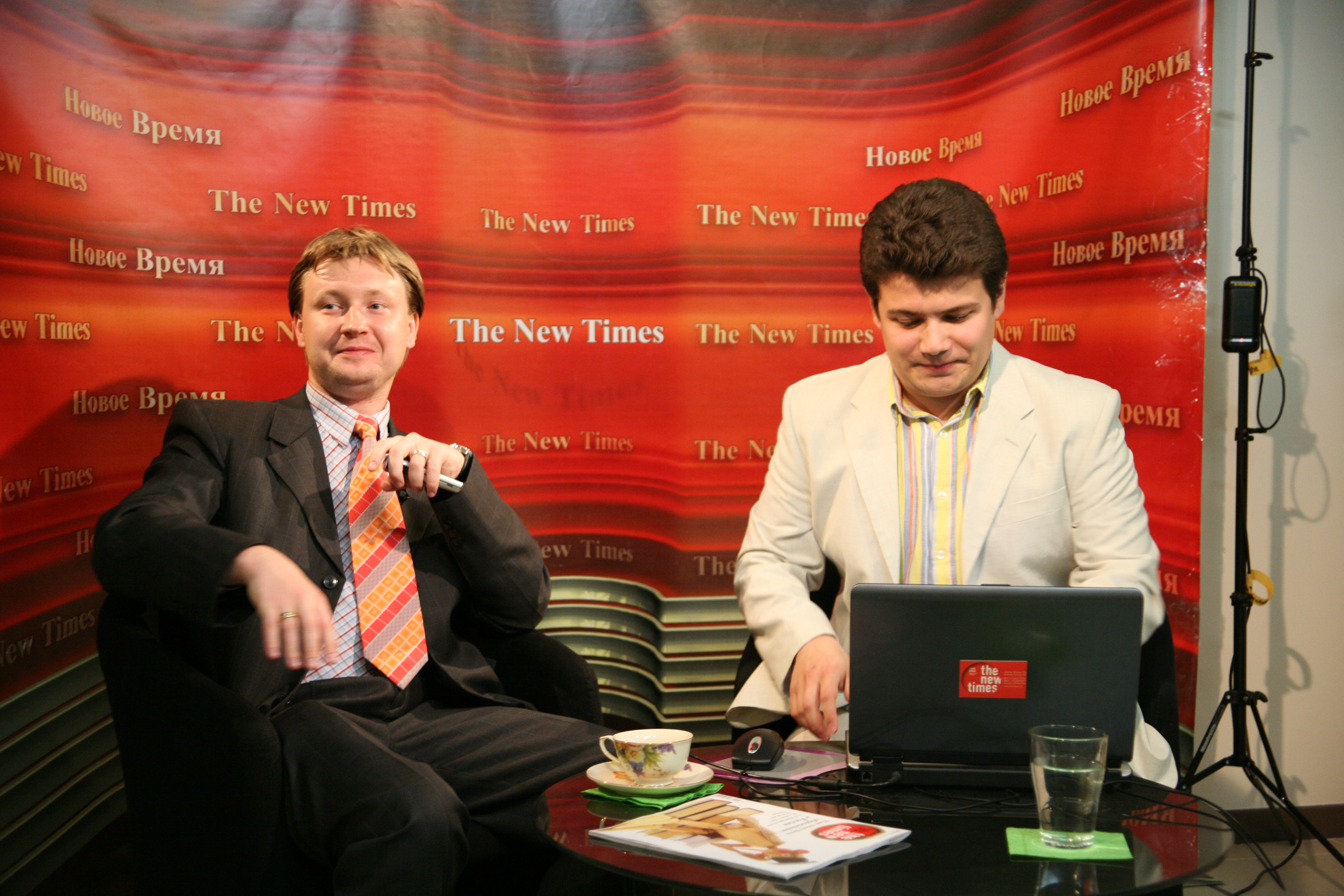
Nikolai Alekseev at video podcast studio of The New Times, 2008
