= Olga Kryshtanovskaya =

Russian sociologist

- Born: November 24, 1954 (age 71); Moscow, Russian SFSR, Soviet Union (now Moscow, Russia)
- Scientific career
- Fields: Sociology
- Workplaces: Russian Academy of Science Institute for Sociology

Olga Viktorovna Kryshtanovskaya (Russian: О́льга Ви́кторовна Крыштано́вская; born 1954) is a Russian sociologist, activist and State Duma deputy from the United Russia party.

== Education and career ==
Kryshtanovskaya works for Russian Academy of Science Institute for Sociology since 1989. In 2003 she discovered that majority of former KGB officials and military personnel are heading the government. In 2005 she published her research under a title of Putin's Elite and since 1991 have published 34 studies. In 2007 she estimated that only 26% of the military personnel that are currently in Kremlin belong to the Siloviki group though this rises to 78% if all those with some connection to military or security services are counted. interview with Radio Free Europe she compared Vladimir Putin to Yuri Andropov saying that:

Andropov thought that the Communist Party had to keep power in its hands and to conduct an economic liberalization. This was the path China followed. For people in the security services, China is the ideal model. They see this as the correct course. They think that [former Russian President Boris] Yeltsin went along the wrong path, as did Gorbachev.

In 1992 she founded and headed the Institute of Applied Politics think tank (ЗАО Институт прикладной политики).

== United Russia ==
In 2009 she joined the United Russia party and became its deputy which was followed by the foundation of ru:Отличницы party in 2010 and two years later became Putin's trustee.

In 2010 she said this about Dmitry Medvedev's policies:

Medvedev might find himself without support from the bureaucracy. Politicians are bound to start thinking one fine day whether they ought to continue supporting the man who would not support them. It is not an idle threat. Consider the opposition leaders we have in Russia nowadays. All of them from Zyuganov to Nemtsov to Yavlinsky to Kasyanov are political 'exiles' if I might use the term.

In 2011 she said that only 6% of Russian women are into politics while the higher education for women is over 50%.

On 12 June 2012 in an interview with Dozhd channel, she said that she will revoke her United Russia membership and will begin to study Russian Revolution since the country is in that phase according to her.

In 2013 amid President Putin's remarks about Alexei Navalny she said that it is Putin's attempt at making sure that the criminal justice system is respected in Russia. The same year she also was quoted saying in The Moscow Times that athletes in other countries of the world will try to boycott 2014 Winter Olympics if Russia will not change its stance on anti-gay laws.

In 2017, she denied any corruption in the Kremlin and the same year sparked an outrage by the parents of children with disabilities. The outrage happened after she proclaimed that disability is caused by parents who are drunk or drug addicts on Time Will Tell.

== Personal life ==
She is married and has a son.
