= Anna Arutunyan =

Russian American journalist, analyst, and author

Anna Arutunyan is a Russian American journalist, analyst, and author.

She was a global fellow at the Wilson Center until 2025.

== Books ==
- Hybrid Warriors: Proxies, Freelancers and Moscow’s Struggle for Ukraine (2022)
- The Putin Mystique (2014)
- The Media in Russia (2009)
