= Silovik =

Russian official from a powerful agency

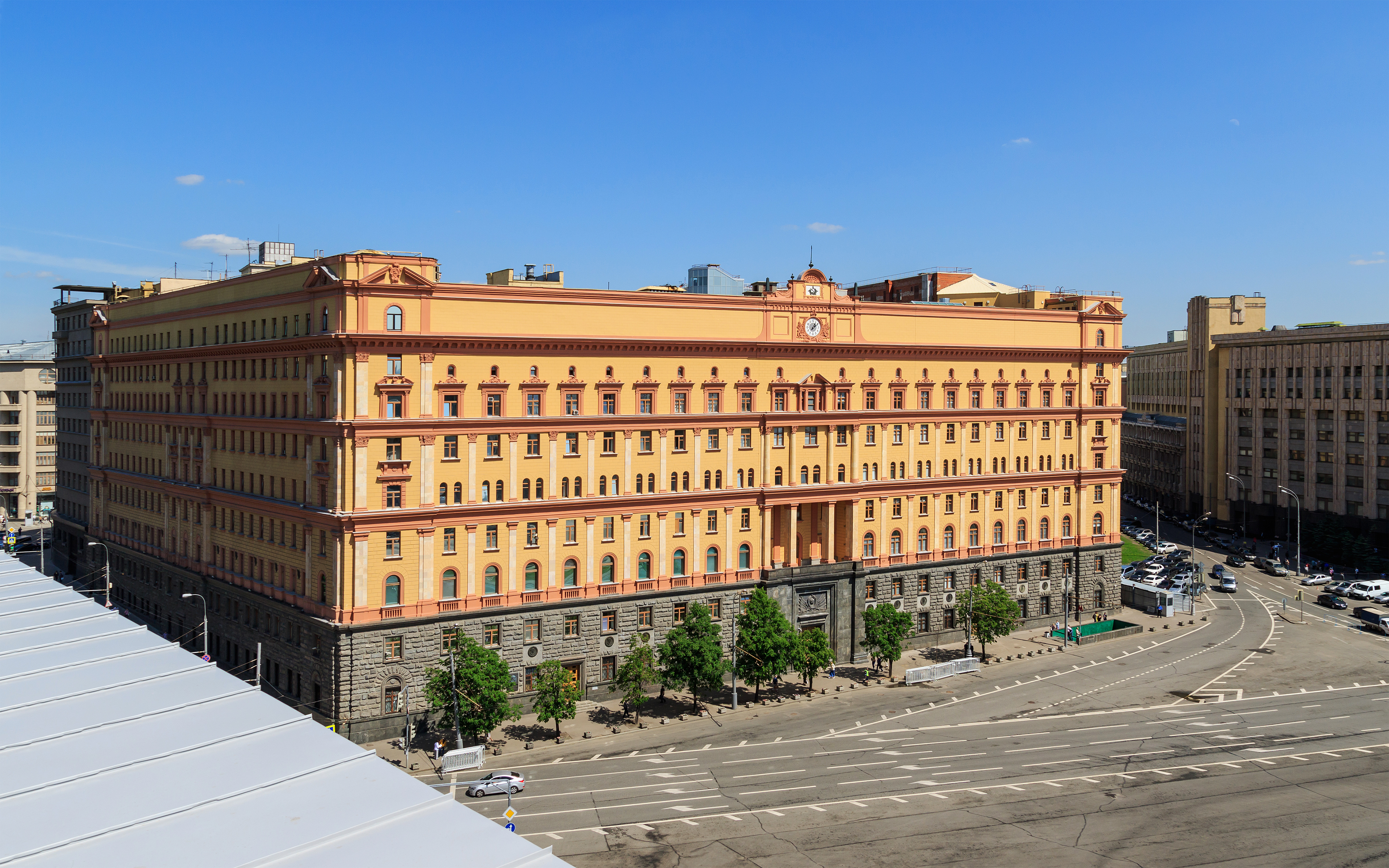
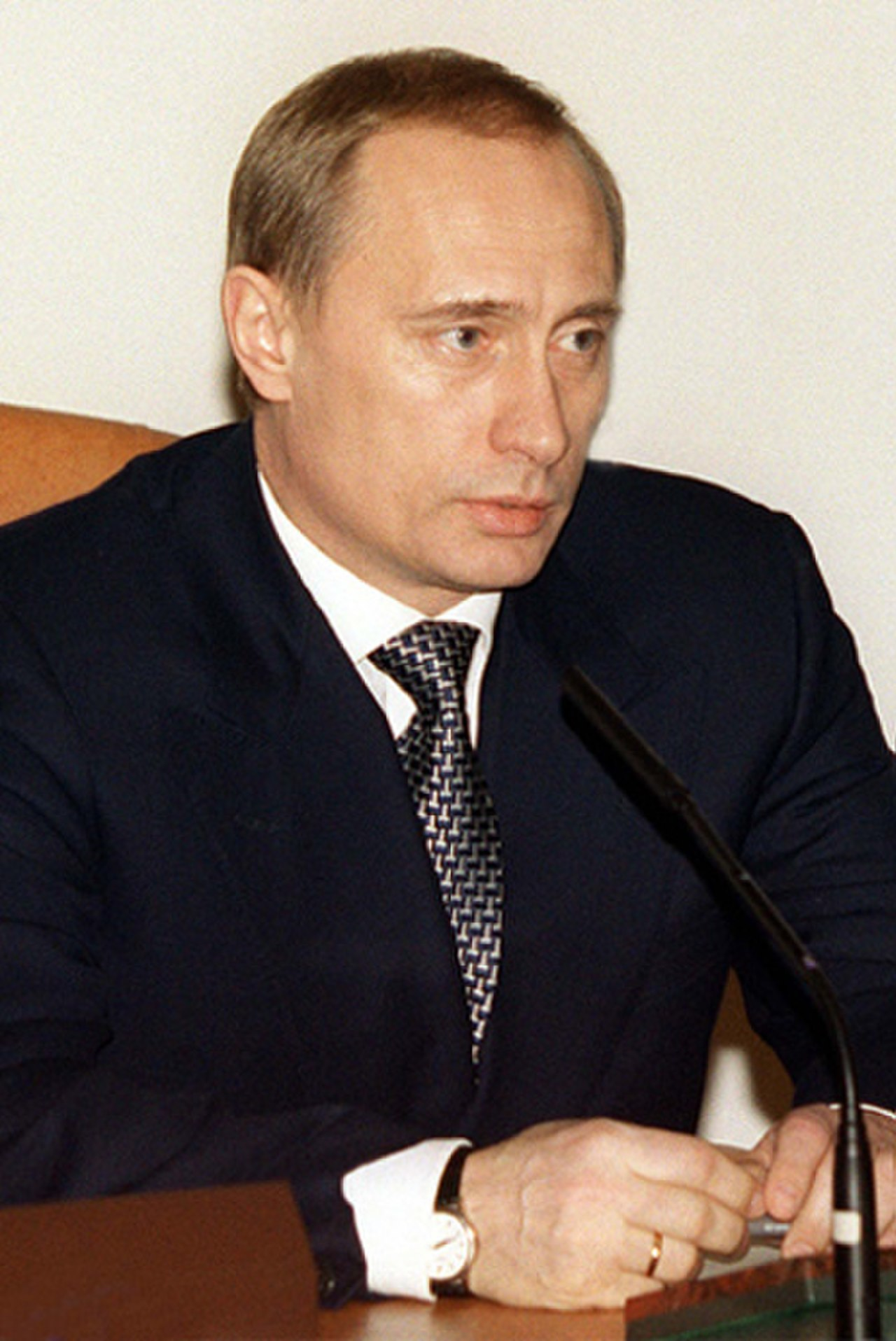
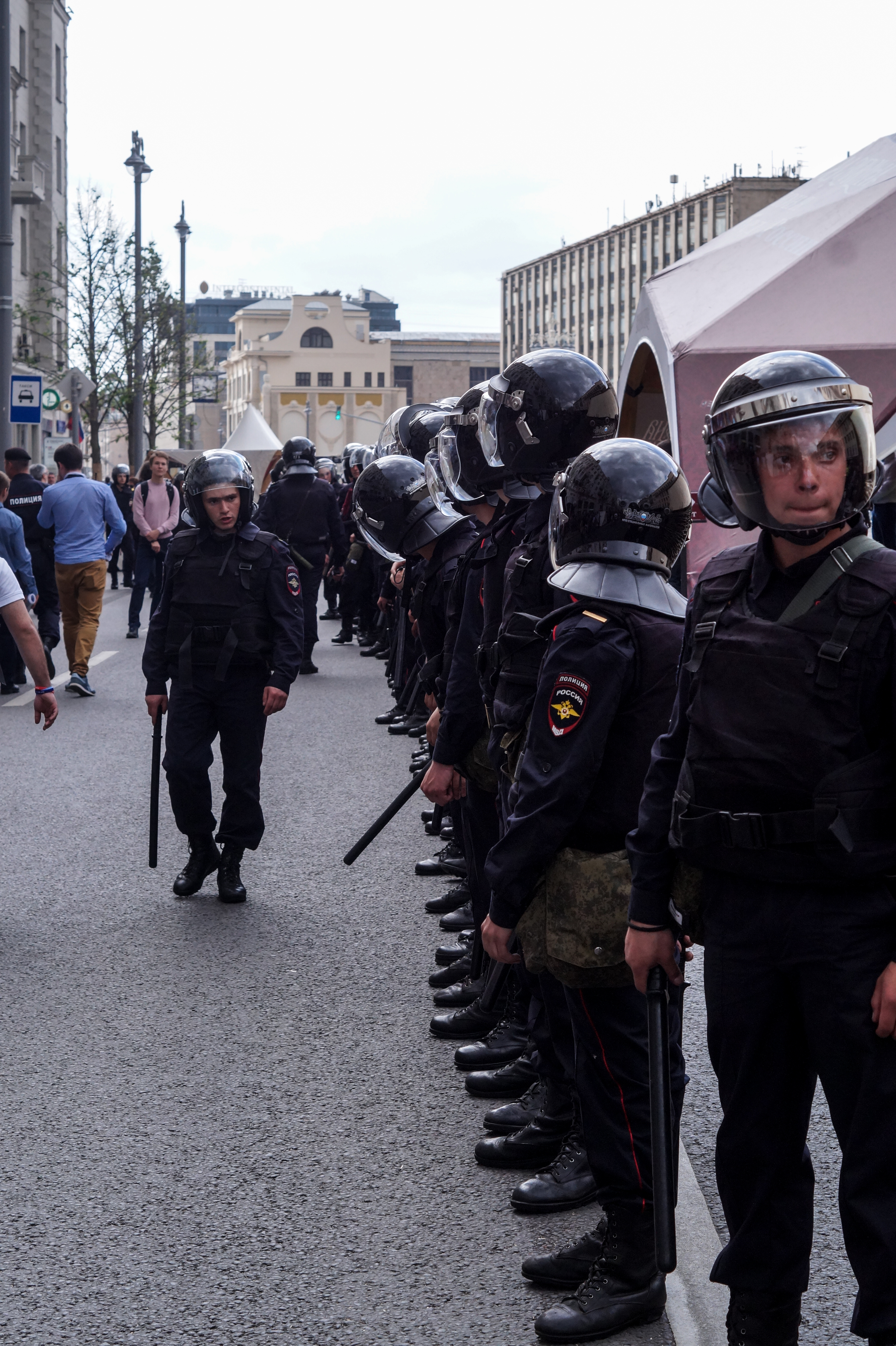
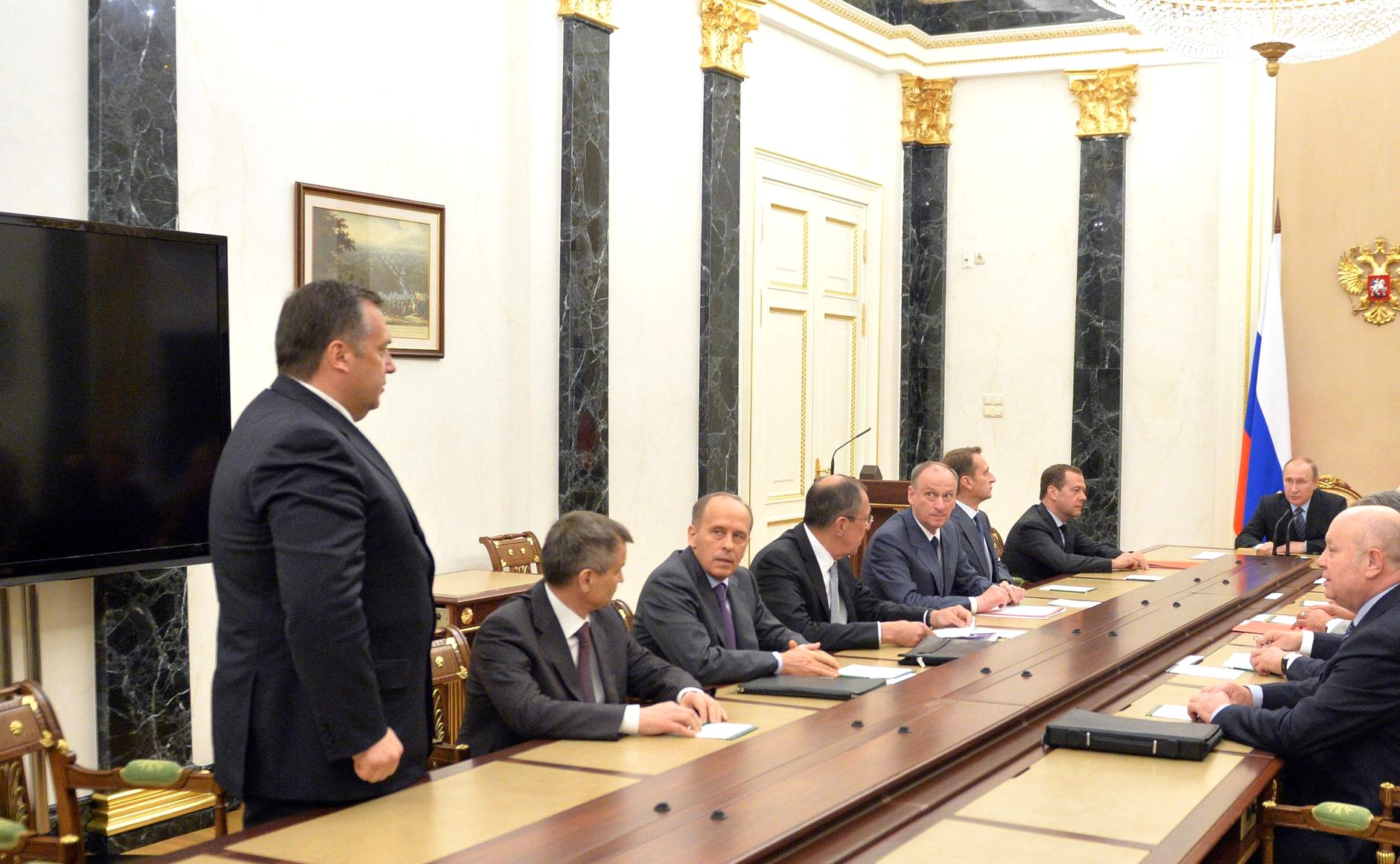
From top to bottom, left to right:
- The building of the Federal Security Service of the Russian Federation (FSB) on Lubyanka Square in Moscow, 2015
- Vladimir Putin addresses the citizens of Russia on 31 December 1999 following the resignation of Boris Yeltsin
- Officers of the Ministry of Internal Affairs of Russia (MVD) and OMON during the dispersal of a protest in Moscow, 12 June 2017
- Meeting of the Security Council of the Russian Federation chaired by the President of Russia, 3 June 2016

In the Russian political context, the siloviki (Russian: силовики; sing. silovik, силовик) are a group of officials originating in the 1990s from the state-security organs, the armed forces, and law-enforcement structures who have occupied positions in the highest echelons of state power in the Russian Federation. Agencies classified as part of the "power ministries" include the Federal Security Service (FSB), the Ministry of Internal Affairs (MVD), the Ministry of Defence, the National Guard (Rosgvardiya), and other structures vested with the authority to use force and charged with functions of defense, state security, and public order. The term is not codified in Russian legislation and is used primarily in political science and journalistic literature as an analytical category describing a segment of the elite professionally socialized within institutions of coercion and security and retaining corporate ties after transitioning to civilian governmental positions.

The emergence of the siloviki as an autonomous segment of the political class is associated with institutional transformations following the dissolution of the Soviet Union and the reorganization of Soviet state-security organs. In the first half of the 1990s, the structure of Russian power was characterized by competition among the presidential administration, parliament, regional elites, and economic groups formed during privatization. Representatives of the power ministries held posts within the state apparatus but did not constitute the predominant component of the ruling stratum and did not control the principal channels of property distribution and economic resources. During this period, their institutional role was defined by the performance of security functions, while economic and administrative actors retained relative autonomy.

In the second half of the 1990s, the balance among elite groups shifted under the impact of political and military crises. Key events included the constitutional crisis of 1993, which culminated in the use of armed force in Moscow; the First Chechen War (1994–1996); the incursion of armed formations into Dagestan in 1999; the Second Chechen War; and a series of terrorist attacks, including the 1999 apartment bombings in Russia. In the context of escalating violence and the increasing salience of internal security concerns, the powers of security agencies were expanded and their participation in the formulation of state policy intensified. Security became a central category of the political agenda, contributing to the institutional consolidation of the siloviki segment.

The appointment in 1998 of Vladimir Putin as director of the FSB, and subsequently as prime minister and acting president of the Russian Federation, coincided with the beginning of a redistribution of influence within the ruling stratum. During the 2000s, a sustained presence of individuals with backgrounds in the security organs was recorded in the Presidential Administration, the Government of the Russian Federation, the Security Council, and in the leadership of strategically significant state corporations. At the same time, the independent political influence of several major entrepreneurial groups that had dominated in the 1990s declined.

In academic literature of the 2000s and 2010s, the siloviki are characterized as the dominant segment of the contemporary Russian ruling class. Their dominance is described through the sustained occupation of key federal-level positions, control over institutions of internal security and defense, and participation in the strategic management of state resources. In this sense, the siloviki are regarded as an institutionally consolidated and self-reproducing component of the post-Soviet Russian political system, formed as a result of elite redistribution in the late 1990s and early 2000s.

== Etymology ==
The term siloviki ('siloviks') is literally translated as "people of force" or "strongmen" (from Russian сила, "force" or "strength"). It originated from the phrase "institutions of force" (Russian: силовые структуры), which appeared in the early Boris Yeltsin era (early 1990s) to denote the military-style uniformed services, including the military proper, the police (Ministry of Internal Affairs), national security (FSB) organisations, and some other structures.

A similar term is "securocrat" (law enforcement and intelligence officer). Daniel Treisman in turn proposed a term "silovarch" (silovik and oligarch).

== Description ==
Siloviki often wish to encourage a view that they might be seen in Russia as being generally non-ideological, with a pragmatic law-and-order focus and Russian national interests at heart. They are generally well educated and bring past commercial experience to their government posts. It is assumed that siloviki have a natural preference for the reemergence of a strong Russian state.

The siloviki do not form a cohesive group. They do not have a single leader and there is no common, articulated "silovik agenda". However, according to John P. Willerton, these security-intelligence officials brought the work ethic and skills—that Putin apparently favoured—to the administration.

A former KGB general said that "a Chekist is a breed ... A good KGB heritage—a father or grandfather, say, who worked for the service—is highly valued by today's siloviki. Marriages between siloviki clans are also encouraged."

== Persons and positions ==
Senior siloviki under the presidency of Vladimir Putin include Sergei Ivanov, Viktor Ivanov, Sergei Shoigu, Igor Sechin, Nikolai Patrushev, Alexander Bortnikov, and Sergey Naryshkin, who have had close working relationships with Putin and held key positions in Putin's governments. Willerton points out, however, that it is difficult to assess whether their common security-intelligence background translates into common political preferences.

Following the 2011 Russian protests, Russian president Dmitry Medvedev, having made promises of political reform, nevertheless appointed several siloviki to prominent positions in the government: Sergei Ivanov to chief of staff of the presidential administration; Dmitry Rogozin to deputy prime minister; and Vyacheslav Volodin to deputy chief of staff.

Putin's chief national security adviser, Nikolai Patrushev, who believed that the West has been in an undeclared war with Russia for years, was a leading figure behind Russia's updated national security strategy, published in May 2021. It stated that Russia may use "forceful methods" to "thwart or avert unfriendly actions that threaten the sovereignty and territorial integrity of the Russian Federation".

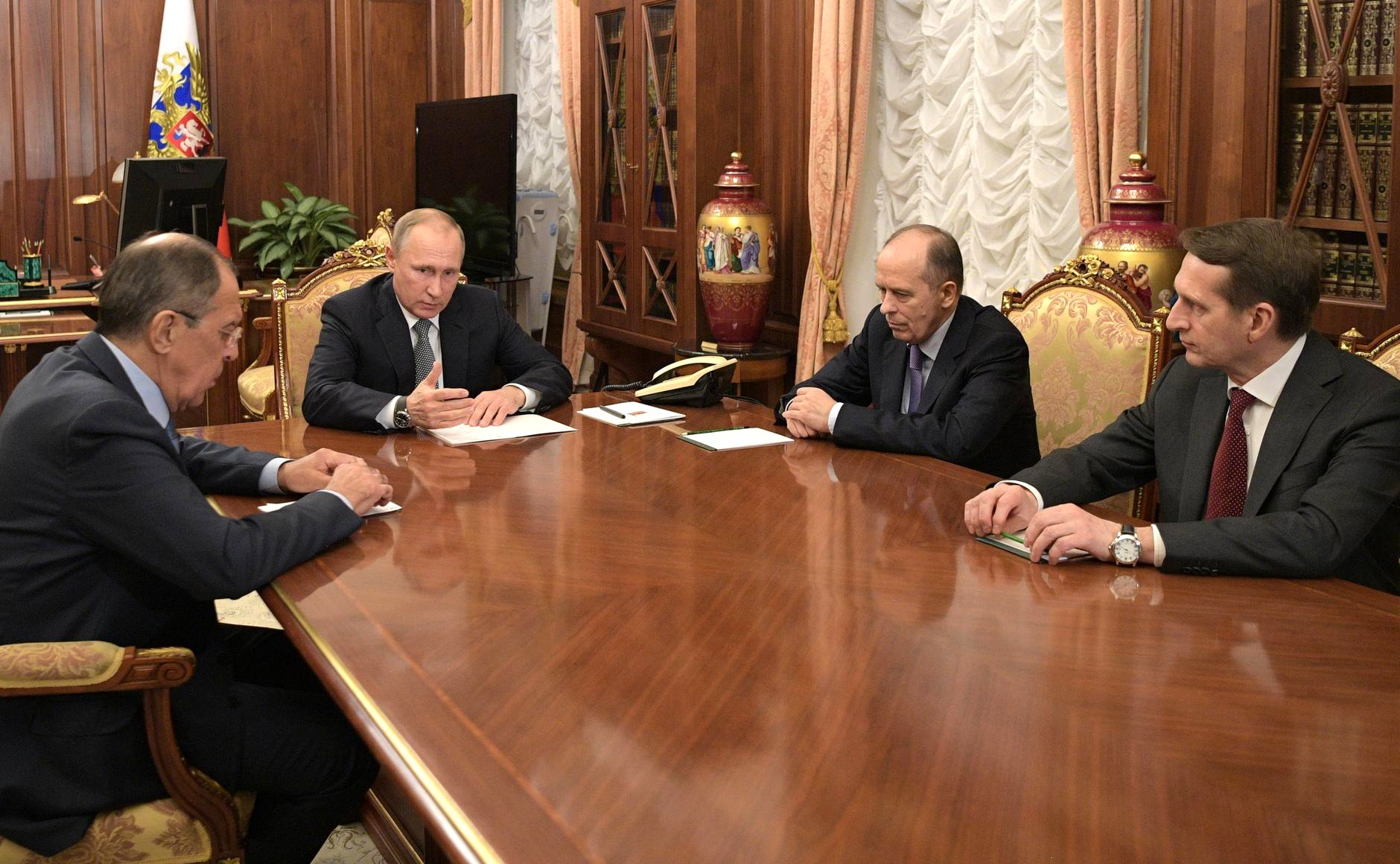
Putin with Sergey Lavrov, Alexander Bortnikov, and Sergei Naryshkin, 19 December 2016

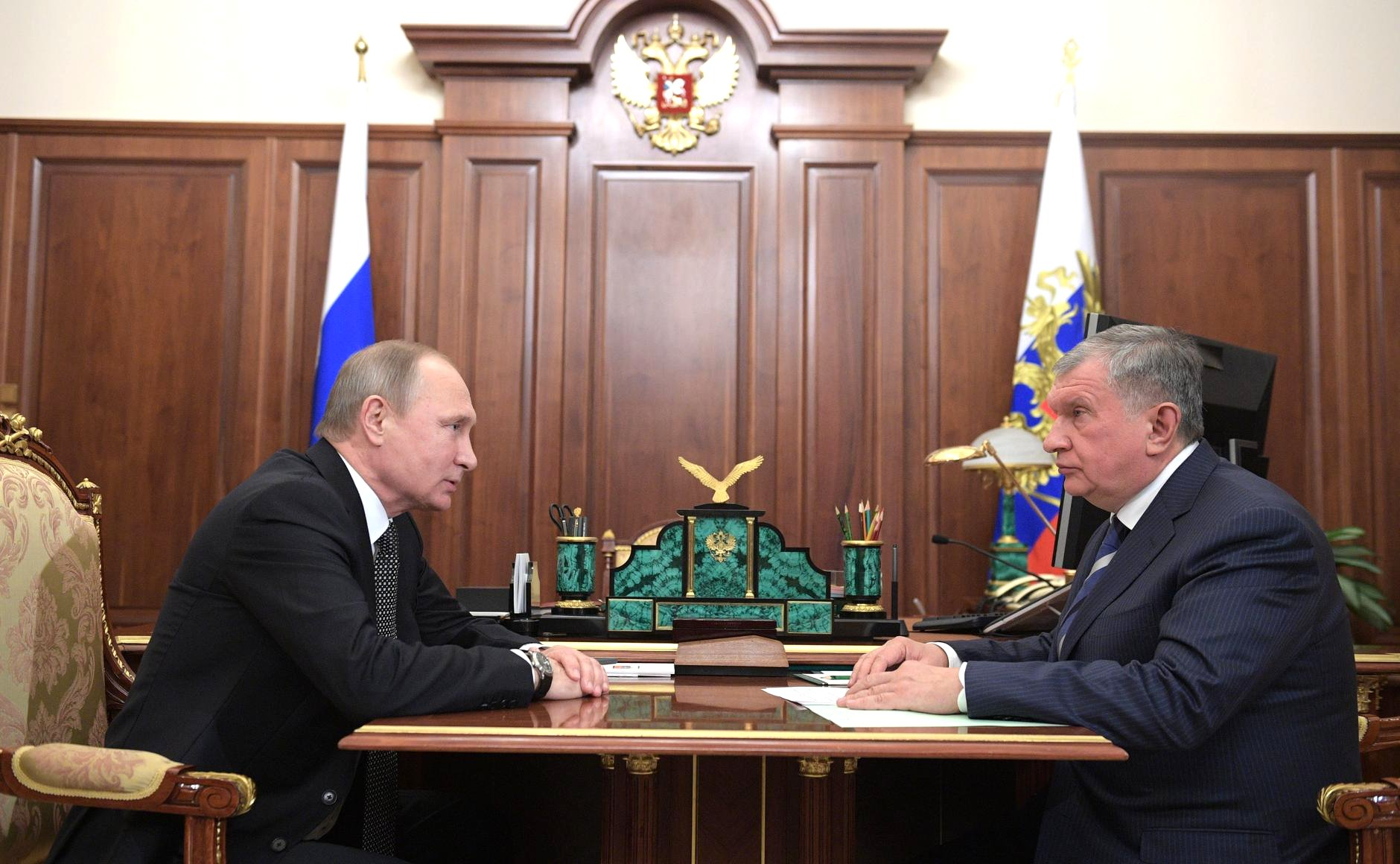
Igor Sechin (right) was often described as one of the closest siloviki to Vladimir Putin. His nickname is Darth Vader

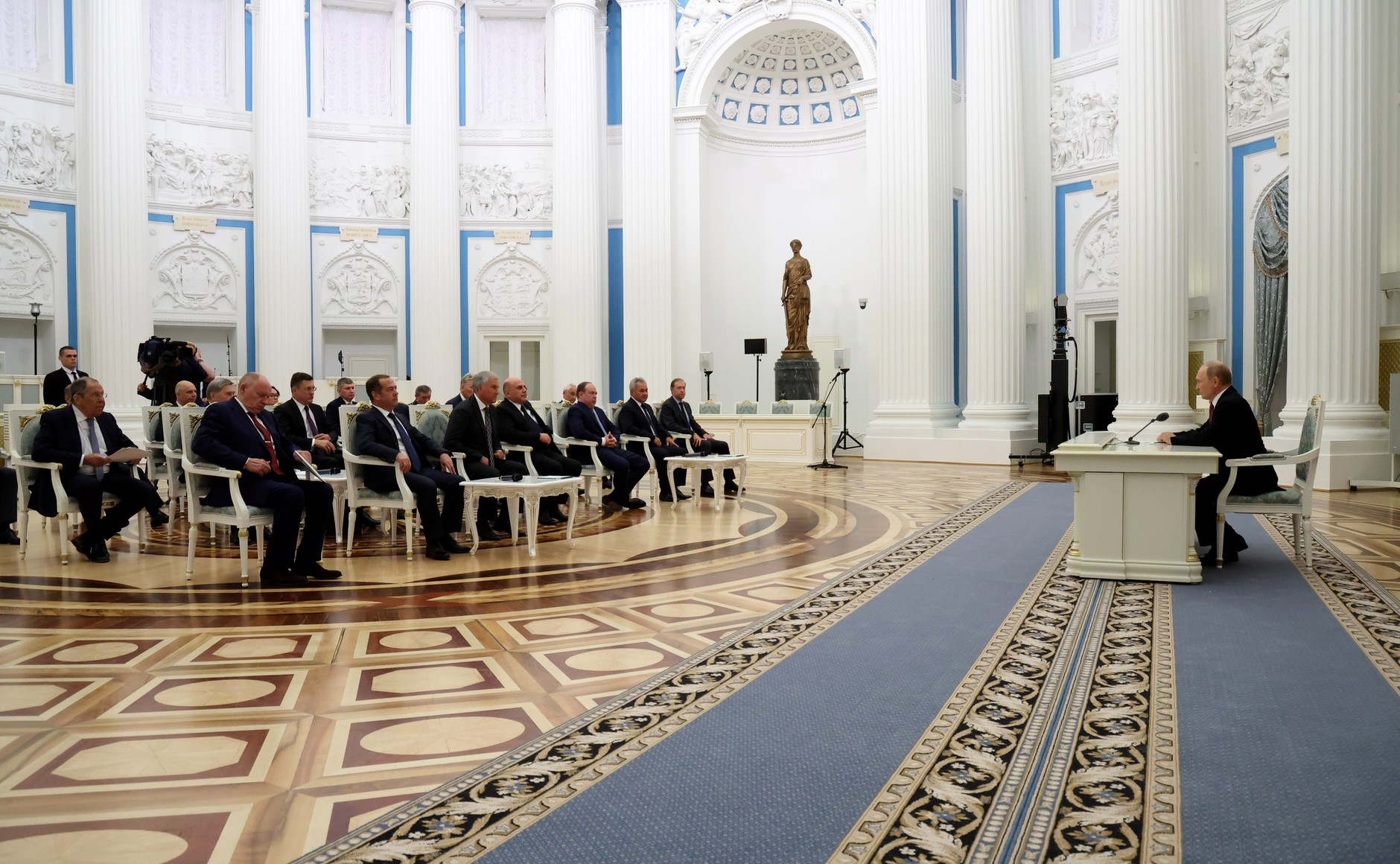
Putin briefs his inner circle on the outcomes of the Russia–United States summit in Anchorage, Alaska, 16 August 2025

== See also ==
- Alphabet boy
- Deep state
- Military junta
- Police state
- Political groups under Vladimir Putin's presidency
- Putinism
- Russia under Vladimir Putin
