= The Russian Public Opinion Herald =

- Format: Sociological Journal
- Owner(s): Levada Center
- Editor: Lev Gudkov
- Founded: 1993 (2003)
- Headquarters: Moscow, Russia
- Website: Levada Center

The Russian Public Opinion Herald (Russian: Вестник общественного мнения) is a Russian sociological journal which is published by the Levada Center four times a year. It was first published in 2003, in combination with the foundation of the Levada Center.

== Description ==
The Russian Public Opinion Herald illustrates the results of monitoring social and economic changes via surveys and opinion polls that a carried out by the Levada Center. This program was originally developed by a collective under the direction of the academician Tatyana Zaslavskaya's in 1992–1993.

Some of the biggest surveys that have been carried out and analyzed in the journal in the past include "protest potential" (since 1993), "relations to economic reforms" (since 1994), "indicators of optimism" (since 1994), "trust in political leaders" (since 2000) and many more.

The journal consists of essays, describing and analysing the results of the different projects. In addition to that there is a tabular part in each issue of the journal to illustrate the outcome of the surveys. Data of certain researches which were published in the past constantly re-appear with updated indicators for their current validity. On several pages of the journal, statistics, theoretical articles, discussions and analytical materials of other researches are also being displayed.

Another part of the journal examines scientific articles, devoted to the basic aspects of the Russian society. Yuri Levada's articles were constantly published in the journal, often concerning the general idea of "The Soviet Person" (Homo Soveticus), a topic which is still of high relevance for the Levada Center today.

The journal is published by the Levada Center in collaboration with the Interdisciplinary Academic Center (Russian: ИНТЕРЦЕНТР).

Lev Gudkov, Boris Dubin, Alexey Levinson, Marina Krasilnikovoja and other employees of the center regularly publish articles in the journal. Some of the most important Russian sociologists, political scientists and researchers who constantly made an appearance in the journal include: Boris Grushin, Igor Kon, Tatyana Vorozhejkina, Georgy Satarov, etc.

In the autumn of 2008 The Russian Public Opinion Herald has been awarded by the Krasnoyarsk fair of book culture for being "a significant contribution to the development of the book industry in Siberia".

In the year of the first publication 2003, only 2 episodes of the journal were released while in the years of 2004 to 2008 the number rose to 6 copies per year. The estimate for 2009 is 4 issues – since very recently, a subscription for a PDF-copy of the journal is also available.

Editor in chief:

- From 2003 to 2006 – Yuri Levada (1930–2006)
- From 2006 to the present day – Lev Gudkov
