= Soviet citizen =

A Soviet citizen may refer to:

- An umbrella term for a citizen, or former citizen, of any member state of the Soviet Union (Soviet people)
- The ideal Soviet citizen, e.g. New Soviet man or Homo Sovieticus
- A believer in the modern-day Union of Slavic Forces of Russia pseudo-legal conspiracy theory
