= Boris Dubin =

Russian sociologist

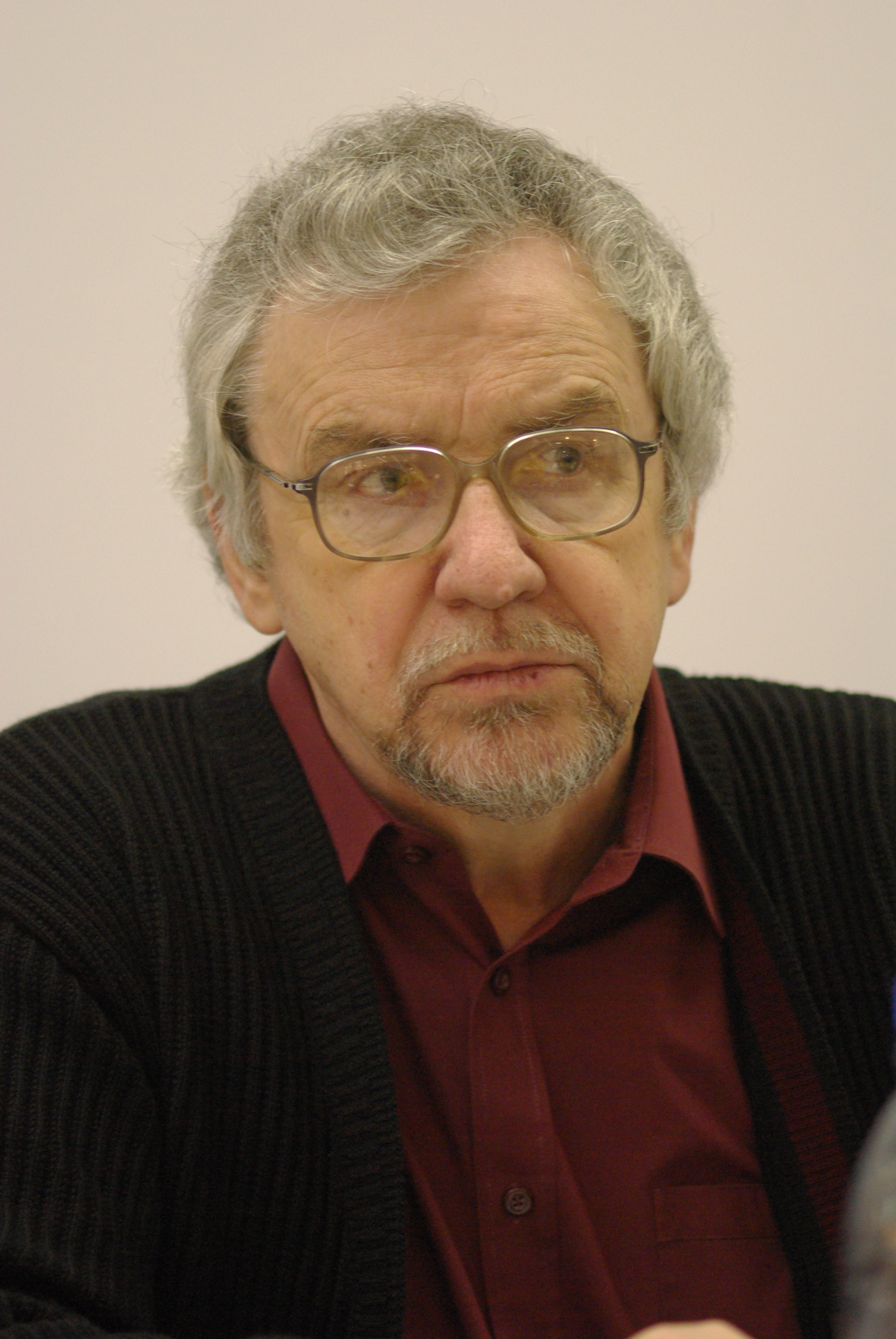
Boris Dubin, 2010

Boris Vladimirovich Dubin (Russian: Борис Владимирович Дубин; 31 December 1946 – 20 August 2014) was a Russian sociologist, and a translator for English, French, Spanish, Latin American and Polish literature. Dubin was the head of department of sociopolitical researches at the Levada Center and the assistant to Lev Gudkov, editor-in-chief of the sociological journal Russian Public Opinion Herald published by the center. Additionally he was a lecturer of sociology of culture at the Russian State University for the Humanities and the Moscow School for the Social and Economic Sciences.

== Professional activities ==
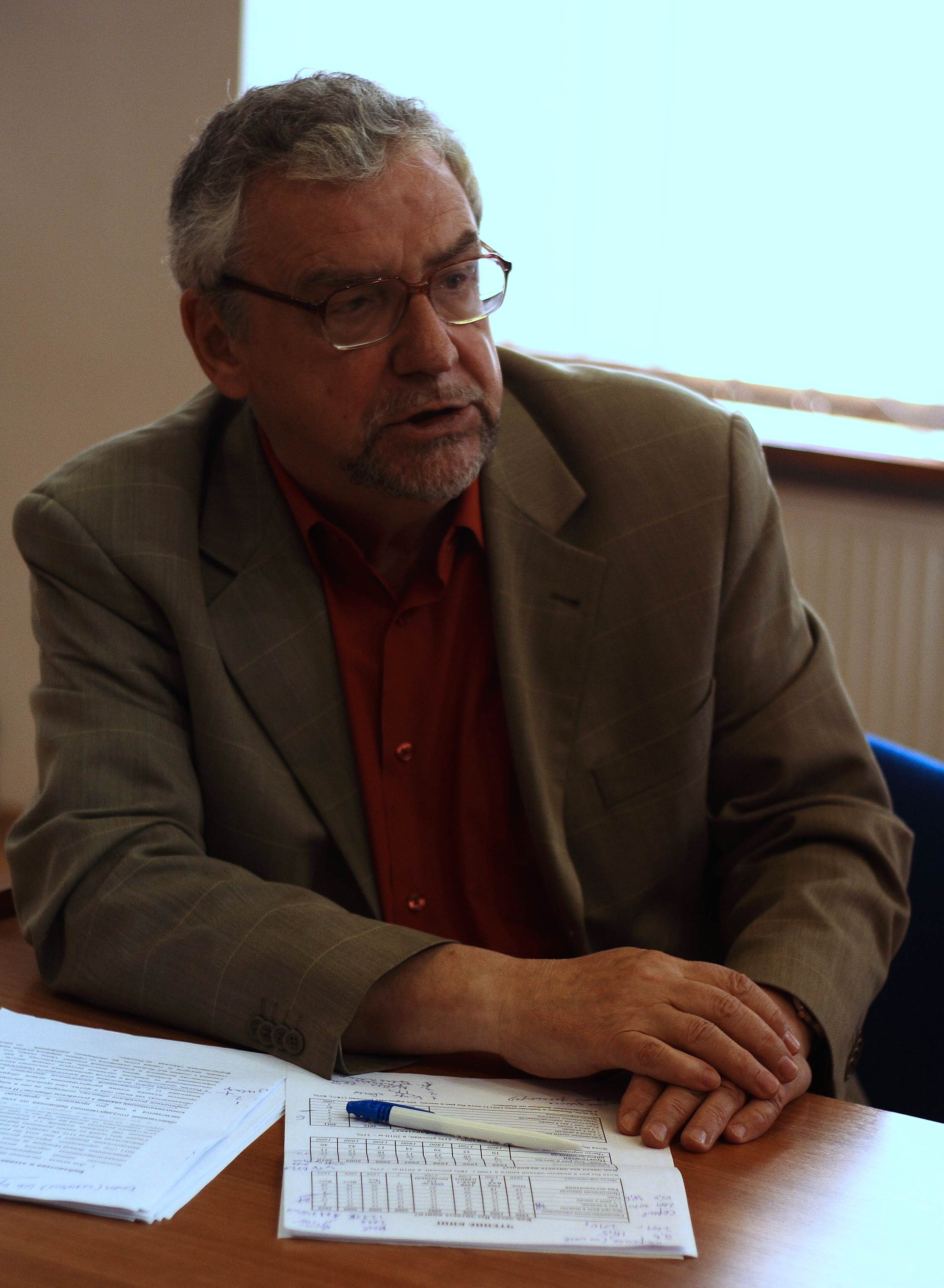
In Lviv, September 2011

Dubin was born into a family of physicians. He was closely connected with the poets of SMOG (Russian: СМОГ), whose poems were printed as a Samizdat. In the second half of the 1960s he visited the seminars of famous poets and translators such as Arseny Tarkovsky, David Samoylov and Boris Slutsky. He graduated from the philological faculty of the Lomonosov Moscow State University in 1970 with a speciality "Russian language and literature; French language". His reviews were published in the public press for the first time in 1970. From 1970 to 1985 Dubin worked for the Russian State Library and in the following three years until 1988 at the All-Union Book Chamber. In 1988—2004 he worked as an employee of the Russian Public Opinion Research Center VCIOM. In 2004 the core of VCIOM employees including Dubin, left the organization and helped to set up the Levada Center under the direction of Yuri Levada.

== Translations ==
In 1970 Dubin co-operated with the publishing house "Fiction" (Russian: Художественная литература), later with "Progress and Rainbow (Russian: Прогресс и Радуга). The first publicized translation was some poems of Théophile Gautier (1972). The largest translation (into Russian) works were the Spanish song lyrics of the Middle Ages and the Renaissance such as John of the Cross, Luis Ponce de León, Juan Boscán Almogáver, Pedro Calderón de la Barca, Luis de Góngora and many more. Other famous writers whose verses and prose he translated were Guillaume Apollinaire, Endre Ady, Jorge Luis Borges, Octavio Paz, César Vallejo, José Lezama Lima, Pablo Neruda, Fernando Pessoa. His translations also included essays of writers such as Susan Sontag, Isaiah Berlin, Maurice Blanchot, Emil Cioran, Henri Michaux, Yves Bonnefoy, Philippe Jaccottet, José Ortega y Gasset, Julio Cortázar, Giorgio Agamben. Dubin translated the works of several Polish authors like Krzysztof Kamil Baczyński, Czesław Miłosz, Janusz Szuber and Eugeniusz Tkaczyszyn-Dycki. He also wrote and translated the anthology "Space in other words: the French poets of the 20th century about an image in art". Besides his translations, Dubin published articles about the latest foreign literature and modern Russian poetry.

Dubin is the winner of different awards for his essays and translations, some of the biggest include the award for "Window" (Russian: Иллюминатор) in 1995, A.Leroy-Beaulieu and M.Vaksmaher for translations from French into Russian, the Andrei Bely Prize for humanitarian researches in 2005 and the International award of Efim Etkind in 2006. Chevalier of The Ordre national du Mérite (France, 2008).

== Recognition ==
Dubin is a winner of several essay and translation awards. He is a knight of the National Order of Merit (France, 2008). He is also a winner of the "Foreign Literature", "Znamya" and "Knowledge is Strength" magazines, the prize of the Ministry of Culture of Hungary, the Anatole Leroy-Bollier Prize (France-Russia), the Maurice Waxmaher Prize (France-Russia), the Efim Etkind Prize and the Andrei Bely Prize.
