= Deafness in Russia =

Social historical topic in deaf history

Deafness in Soviet Russia experienced a cultural transformation following the Russian Revolution. The Soviet's collectivist ideology, termed New Soviet, promoted the integration of deaf people within a predominantly hearing civilization. Thus, state-sponsored organizations, such as All-Russian Society of the Deaf, fostered cultural and professional opportunities for Russia's deaf population.

== Background ==
Prerevolutionary Russian culture considered deafness a crippling condition comparable with insanity and intellectual disability. Birthed from the prerevolutionary establishment of deaf schools, Russian deaf culture communalized said minority. However, Russia's deaf education system struggled due to inconsistent government funding. Thus, deaf schools relied on philanthropic contributions. The lack of government financing helped preserve Russian Sign Language during an oralist era. Marginalized by the tsarist legal system, Russia's deaf population supported the Bolshevik revolution. Soviet socialism promoted economic participation, thereby favoring physically able beings.

== Deaf cultural identity ==
The New Soviet ideology promoted unity through the personal surmounting of physical and social obstacles. Thus, societal contribution superseded physical defects. A dire need for laborers and an affirmative outlook on disabilities strengthened Russia's deaf communities. Furthermore, the deaf established themselves as able-bodied workers by highlighting the invisible nature of their disorder. Soviet ideologies allowed for the politicization of deaf community members. As a result, political collaboration fostered the development of deaf community identity. However, the strengthening of Russia's deaf movement brought the invisible disorder to light. The establishment of deaf-accessible spaces highlighted the deaf communities' otherness. Furthermore, the deaf labeled themselves as medically disabled. Thus, Russia's hearing communities lacked faith that the deaf could successfully overcome their impairment and become ideal New Soviet people.

To combat such stigma, deaf communities developed a social identity focused on self-sufficiency. The self-establishment of deaf culture highlights deaf community members' embracing of New Soviet values. In 1962, the Soviet government recognized deaf people's future capability of embodying the New Soviet ideal. Thus, the late 1940s through 1970s represent a high point in Russian deaf history. However, Russia's deaf population struggled to prove their self-sufficiency. A 1957 Izvestia article highlights the deaf population's acceptance of social welfare. Furthermore, the deaf's ability to achieve New Soviet ideals came into question following Izvestia's publication of "Pygmalion." This article reveals an unwillingness to assimilate into New Soviet culture among some of Russia's deaf population. Additionally, "Pygmalion" notes comparatively increased deviance and economic nonparticipation among Russia's deaf.

Ultimately, Russia's deaf population failed to transition into New Soviet culture. In the 1960s, the deaf population's focus shifted to strengthening deaf communities, falling further into social seclusion. Thus, a clear societal division saw the return of prerevolutionary deaf marginalization. An article published in 1984 notes the medical use of "GN—UO," a prerevolutionary term meaning "Deaf-mute—Mentally Retarded."

=== Education ===
Deaf education stabilized following consistent financial backing from the Soviet regime. Additionally, the Soviet Union partitioned deaf schooling into the following categories: born entirely deaf, born partly deaf, late-deafened. Such division increased social interaction and tailored language modalities to account for students' needs. However, prerevolutionary oralism extended into the Soviet era. The New Soviet's commitment to social and economic participation favored the speaking modality. Russia's deaf population recognized the economic implications of sign-only communication. Thus, Russia's deaf embraced both spoken and signed language modalities.

Higher education was accessible to deaf students. Furthermore, VOG organized vocational training workshops for the deaf. With the state's support, VOG established deaf-only alternatives for on-site industrial-educational programs termed Rabfaks.

=== Economy ===
The Soviet collectivist ideologies alleviated economic competition, thereby easing the deaf population's employment barriers. In addition, by highlighting their physical capabilities, the deaf population realized greater employment opportunities than those with other disabilities. According to Soviet theorist Lev Vygotsky, deaf laborers exhibit comparable working abilities to their hearing counterparts. Thus, the deaf disorder's invisible nature aided in the economic advancement of Russia's deaf.

Through employment, the deaf approached New Soviet idealisms. Thus, oralism's vocational advantages encouraged its acceptance among Russia's deaf population.

=== Social ===
Following the Russian Revolution, communal urban areas saw an increased presence of deaf beings. However, public signing illuminated the naturally invisible disorder that is deafness. Thus, social disparities and public inaccessibility prompted the creation of deaf spaces. Such spaces demonstrated the deaf's cultural, self-sufficient, and economic advancements. Additionally, hearing people were encouraged to use these spaces. Through social integration, the deaf wished to highlight their capability of New Soviet transformation.

The deaf population benefited from Russia's cultural enthusiasm toward mime and theater. Viewed as a natural setting for the deaf, theater highlighted deaf cultural sophistication.

==== Public spaces ====
Distinguishable by a dense signing presence, deaf spaces encouraged public collaboration among Russia's deaf community members. Language accessibility fostered a unique deaf identity that overlooked their physical inabilities. Additionally, the deaf identity embodied labor capability, cultural advancement, and self-sufficiency. The construction of deaf spaces strengthened internal community ties and encouraged social engagement. Furthermore, deaf spaces represented the deaf population's embracement of New Soviet values. However, congregated public signing illuminated the deaf disorder. Thus, deaf spaces negatively influenced hearing society's impressions of the deaf by challenging Soviet uniformity.

==== Theater ====
Theater represented a significant segment of Soviet culture. Viewed as a natural atmosphere for the hard of hearing, theaters provided employment opportunities for Russia's deaf. Founded in 1957 with VOG's support, the Theatre Studio of Sign and Gesture trained deaf actors in various theatrical crafts. Renamed Theatre of Sign and Gesture following governmental support in 1963, the theater highlighted the deaf population's cultural refinement. Through training, deaf actors proved skillfully equivalent to their hearing counterparts. For example, deaf actors learned rhythm through musical vibrations. Thus, through cultural advancements and showcasing their artistic capabilities, Russia's deaf population approached New Soviet idealisms.

== Organizations ==
=== All-Russian Society of the Deaf (VOG) ===
Founded in 1926 by Ivan Savel'ev, VOG is a deaf-run organization initially backed by the Soviet state. Originally centered around employment services, VOG established vocational training centers. Additionally, VOG's social clubs strengthened internal deaf community relations. Striving to achieve New Soviet transformation, VOG extended its focus to include cultural advancement. With governmental funding, VOG hosted deaf-only sporting events and art exhibitions. Additionally, VOG organized the construction of various deaf spaces and cultural centers. Membership rates soared, reaching 96% among deaf Muscovites in 1949. Valuing self-sufficiency, in 1954, VOG refused governmental funding after citing sufficient revenue. Self-sufficiency remained a reoccurring theme among VOG's projects through deaf-funding, deaf-labor, and deaf-leadership.

Furthermore, VOG worked closely with state officials to influence social politics on the deaf's behalf. In 1926, the Soviet government sponsored a deaf-for-deaf newspaper called The Life of a Deaf-Mute. The paper highlighted the deaf's political advancements by repeatedly criticizing the Soviet state without reprimand. However, a lack of governmental pushback may represent a non-threatening perception of the deaf community.
