= Sovok =

Pejorative term related to the Soviet Union

Sovok (совок) is a Russian-language slang and pejorative term used in Russia and Ukraine to describe the Soviet Union, the mindset and lifestyle of Soviet people, and the perceived remnants of Soviet culture and psychology in post-Soviet states.

The term initially emerged within late-Soviet counterculture and diaspora circles. Although it first represented a critique of state-sponsored economic dysfunction, it later became a broader sociological or psychological diagnosis. It has come to denote an individual or mentality characterized by state dependency, social apathy, resistance to change, and compliance with authoritarian structures. It is related to the concept Homo Sovieticus, although sovok gained greater popularity within the Soviet population.

== Etymology ==
Several people claim the authorship of the term, but it likely emerged across multiple subcultures before coming into mainstream use.

"Sovok" is derived from the word "Soviet". A common meaning of the word "sovok" is 'dustpan' in Russian and Ukrainian. Linguist Lyudmila Kasyanova writes that the use of "sovok" as a pejorative term applies the negative associations with trash. Mikhail Epstein notes that the suffix "-ok" may convey a dismissive tone in Russian.

There are a number of derived words: adjective: "sovkovy" (совковый), "pertaining to 'sovok'"; noun: совковость ('sovkovost', "sovokness") the totality of the traits of a sovok, and the adverb in Russian: совково, romanized: sovkovo, lit. 'in a sovok way'.

== Meanings ==
=== Soviet Union ===
In its generic meaning the term implies something dysfunctional, commenting on why things are run poorly or why a person behaves badly. Borenstein writes: "When the Soviet Union is called 'sovok', everyone knows what this means: economic deprivation, administrative incompetence, defective consumer technology, an intrusive public culture, bombastic rhetoric that is easily ignored, and widespread hypocrisy."

=== Soviet people ===
Borenstein concisely defines a "sovok" person as "Soviet yokel" and the first two chapters of his book Soviet Self-Hatred are devoted to the analysis of this category of people.

Alexander Genis describes the sovok as characterized in post-Soviet journalism as possessing "a violent thirst for equality, a deaf hatred for anyone else's success, and an indolence that blazes energy".

=== Modern Russia ===
Many people think that in modern Russia, despite its transition away from Communism, the negative sovok traits are preserved.

The Levada Center's polling notes that the term remains relevant in issues involving western-oriented reforms and conservative positions.

=== Modern Ukraine ===
According to Oleksiy Moskalenko (2025):

In Ukraine, anything associated with the Soviet system is often derisively called “sovok,” a slang term used even by those who never directly experienced the USSR. The word evokes images of inefficiency and indifference — what some describe as “anti-humanism, anti-dignity” — as well as fear of taking responsibility, a compulsion to please superiors, and the practice of performing tasks for their own sake, not for results. The term typically refers to outdated bureaucratic habits and the attitude of personnel delivering public services.

== In popular culture ==
In 1988, Igor Talkov composed the nationalist anthem "Sovki" to criticize those that supported the maintenance of the failing state.

The term affected foreign perception of Soviets through portrayals such as in Yuri Mamin's comedy drama film Window to Paris (1993), which depicted post-Soviet tourists as embodying coarse stereotypes with materialistic goals antithetical to western values.

At the end of the 20th century, Victor Pelevin, a postmodern writer, provides a sympathetic portrayal of this archetype as a member of the post-Soviet intelligentsia that protested against the universalizing of western values, particularly materialism.

== See also ==
- Sovdepiya
- Russian political jokes
