= Lev Gudkov =

Russian sociologist

- Лев Гудков
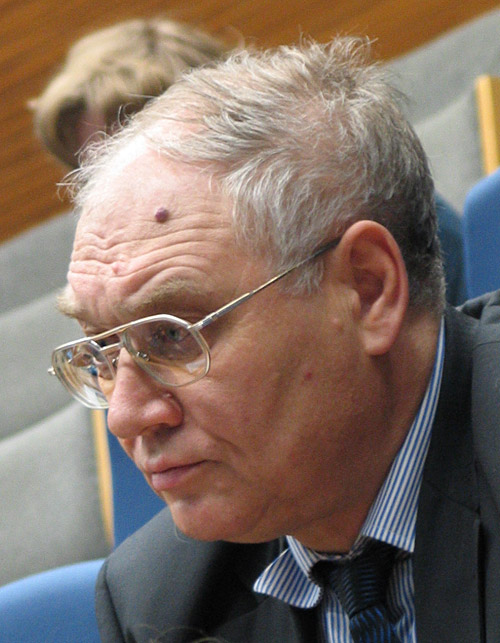
- Gudkov in 2009
- Born: December 6, 1946 (age 79); Moscow, Soviet Union
- Education: Lomonosov Moscow State University
- Scientific career
- Fields: Sociology

Lev Dmitrievich Gudkov (Russian: Лев Дмитриевич Гудков; 6 December 1946) is a Russian sociologist and one of the leading researchers of Russian public opinion. He was the director of the Levada Center from 2006 to 2021 and has since served as the center's academic supervisor. He is also the editor-in-chief of the Russian Public Opinion Herald. He is known for developing, together with Yuri Levada, the concept of “Homo Sovieticus” (“Soviet Man”). In 2025, he was designated as a “foreign agent” by the Russian Ministry of Justice. Gudkov has been described as the “Galileo Galilei” of Russian sociology.

== Early life and education ==
Gudkov was born on 6 December 1946.

He studied journalism, sociology, and philology at the Lomonosov Moscow State University and graduated in 1971. From 1970 to 1973, Gudkov worked for the department of methodology of researching social processes at the Russian Academy of Sciences.

In the following four years until 1977, Gudkov was an employee of the department of philosophy and sociology at the Institute for Scientific Information on Social Studies, which belongs to the Russian Academy of Sciences. He continued his post-graduate studies at the Institute for Philosophy of the Russian Academy of Sciences until 1977. His dissertation concerned Max Weber's concept of the methodology of social sciences and the German tradition of the understanding of sociology.

== Career ==
From 1977 to 1984, Gudkov was a senior researcher of the Sociology Department at the Russian State Library.Between 1984 and 1986, he worked as one of the leading scientific employees at the Sociology Department of the Design Research Institute. Gudkov was the senior scientific employee of the All-Union book chamber from 1986 until 1988. In 1988, he started working for VCIOM, and became one of the leading scientists of the research center soon thereafter. Three years later, in 1991, Gudkov was made the head of the theory and later the sociopolitical department of research at VCIOM.

Gudkov participated in all research projects at VCIOM during the period when the center was administered by Yuri Levada, such as;

- “The Soviet person from 1989 to 2003”
- “Bureaucracy”
- “Russian nationalism”
- “Results of a year: The society from 1989 to 2003”

In 1995, Gudkov completed his PhD.

=== Work at the Levada Center ===
In 2003 internal problems appeared at VCIOM, Gudkov and Yuri Levada left with the majority of employees to work for Yuri Levada's newly founded centre, the Levada Center. After Yuri Levada's death in 2006, Gudkov followed as director of the Levada Center, by a unanimous decision of the board of the centre. Since December 2006 Gudkov has worked as the editor-in-chief of the magazine The Russian Public Opinion Herald.

Gudkov also worked as a lecturer. In 1994, he lectured sociology at the Jewish University of Moscow. From 1996 to 2004 and in 2006, he was a lecturer in sociology at the Russian State University for the Humanities. Additionally, from 2005 to 2007 he gave lecture and seminars on the topic “Russia – a transitional society?—Cultural and institutional factors of socio-political conservatism in post-Soviet Russia” at the department of Political Science at the Moscow School of Social and Economic Sciences.

=== The “Homo Sovieticus” concept ===
Gudkov is credited with developing the concept of “Homo Sovieticus” or “Soviet Man”, understood as an account of how the pressures of a totalitarian rule transform people's values, producing a decline in social trust, and rise of cynicism and opportunistic behaviour. Gudkov has argued that the traits have persisted in post-Soviet Russia, and considers them the central obstacle to Russia's political and economic modernisation.

== Personal life ==
As of 2023, Gudkov lives in Russia. In an interview with Der Spiegel he said, “I'm already old; it's too late for me to move away.” When asked what effect the developments have on him personally, he said, “I would call it depression, an occupational hazard.”

== Publications ==
Gudkov is the author of several books and articles considering the theory and methodology of sociology, sociology of literature, ethno-national relations, and social problems of the post-Soviet society, including:

- Lev Gudkov. Metafora i ratsionalnost' v perspektive socialnoi epistemologii. Moscow, 1994 (Metaphor and rationality as the problem for social epistemology).
- Lev Gudkov, Boris Dubin. Intelligentsia. Moscow-Kharkov, 1995
- Lev Gudkov, Boris Dubin. Literatura kak socialnyi institut. Moscow (Literature as a social institute) Moscow, NLO, 1995
- Gudkov, L. and Levinson, A. Attitudes Toward Jews in the Soviet Union: Public Opinion in Ten Republics. New York: American Jewish Committee, 1993
- Gudkov, L. and Levinson, A. Attitudes toward Jews in the Commonwealth of Independent States. New York: American Jewish Committee, 1994
- Prostoi sovetskii chelovek: Opyt socialnogo portreta na rubezhe 1990 godov. Moskva, 1993 (in co-auth. with Yu. Lewada, B. Dubin, A. Levinson, and N. Zorkaja): (German translation: Die Sowjetmenschen: Soziogramm eines Zerfalls, 1989-1991. B., Argon, 1992.)
- Gudkov L, Dubin B. Obtschestvennyi dogovor v Rossii (Social contract in Russia). Sociological survey. Moscow, 2001.,
- “Russia—A Society in Transition? ”. Telos 120 (Summer 2001). New York: Telos Press.
- La Russia postcomunista. Da Gorbaciov a Putin. Luiss University Press, 2005, 181 p.
- Gudkov L., Dubin B., Lewada Yu. Problema elity v sovremennoi Rossii (Problem of Elites in contemporary Russia), Moscow, 2007
