= Levada Center =

Russian polling and research organization

- Formation: 2003 (1987)
- Type: Research institute, independent nongovernmental organization
- Purpose: opinion polls, social research, marketing research
- Location: Moscow
- Key people: Lev Gudkov, director Tatyana Zaslavskaya, honorary president Alexei Grazhdankin, Boris Dubin, Marina Krasilnikova, Alexey Levinson and Yuri Poletayev, Lyudmila Khakhulina
- Staff: Approximately 60
- Website: www.levada.ru

The Levada Center is a Russian independent, nongovernmental polling and sociological research organization. It is named after its founder, the first Russian professor of sociology Yuri Levada. The center traces back its history to 1987 when the All-Union Public Opinion Research Center (VTsIOM) was founded under the leadership of academician Tatyana Zaslavskaya. As one of Russia's largest research companies, the Levada Center regularly conducts its own and commissioned polling and marketing research. In 2016, it was labelled a foreign agent under the 2012 Russian foreign agent law.

== History ==
The Levada Center was formed in 1987–88 as the All-Union Public Opinion Research Center (VTsIOM, Russian: ВЦИОМ), under the direction of Tatyana Zaslavskaya, Boris Grushin, Valery Rutgajzer and Yuri Levada. VTsIOM was the first organization to carry out representative mass surveys within the Russian population. Tatyana Zaslavskaya, now the honorary president of Levada Center, headed VTsIOM in 1987–1992, followed by Yuri Levada from 1992 to 2003.

In August 2003 the Ministry for Property Relations attempted to take control of the center by placing government officials on the VTsIOM board of directors. All the employees of VTsIOM quit in response and continued their work under a new name, VTsIOM-A. After the Federal Antimonopoly Service forbade them to use this name, the new organization was renamed "Levada Analytical Center", (Levada Center).

The Levada Center has continued the research programs started by its collective in the 1990s–2000s. One of the largest projects is the study "The Soviet Person" study, or Homo Soveticus, Russian: Советский человек, in which specialists used surveys to monitor and identify significant trends in the social development of Russia's society over the past 15 years.

=== Founding of VTsIOM ===
The founding and development of the agency was intertwined with the career of its founder, Yuri Levada – the first professor to teach sociology at Moscow State University. During the political thaw initiated by Nikita Khrushchev, Levada was allowed to carry out limited surveys of public opinion. In one lecture, Levada asserted that tanks could not change ideologies, a reference to the Soviet invasion of Czechoslovakia in 1968. However, his first conflict with those in power came from a survey asserting that few actually read Pravda's notoriously longwinded editorials; and Pravda quickly and bitterly denounced the sociologist. In 1972, his institute was closed down during a Brezhnev-era purge of some 200 sociologists from research institutes and universities.

Levada was reinstated by reformist Soviet leader Mikhail Gorbachev as glasnost was under way. He went on to establish the Russian Public Opinion Research Center in 1987, which was renamed All-Union Public Opinion Research Center (VTsIOM) after the end of Soviet Union in 1991. In an interview, Yuri Levada referred to Tatyana Zaslavskaya and Boris Grushin as the founders of VTsIOM in 1987. He stated that he was invited by them to join VTsIOM.

=== Breakup and founding of Levada Center ===
VTsIOM became widely respected for its objectivity and professionalism among academics and journalists in both the Soviet Union and the West. In the 1990s, the agency's polls gained a reputation for reliability. (Note: A free-access, English-language assessment of the accuracy of poll ratings published by VTsIOM throughout the 1996 presidential and parliamentary election year is offered by an Indiana University site at "Opinion Poll Data". www.cs.indiana.edu. Archived from the original on 21 September 2006..)

Although VTsIOM received no government funding, instead relying on private-sector polling contracts from the breakdown of Soviet Union in 1992 to 2003, Levada had not addressed the fact that, on paper, the polling agency remained a state-owned agency.

This allowed the state to employ a legal technicality and appoint a new board of directors in September 2003, composed mainly of its officials, to oversee the work of VTsIOM. None of VTsIOM's sociologists were among these government appointments. Up to that point, VTsIOM had conducted over 1,000 polls.

Levada stated that the Kremlin move was aimed in part at silencing growing public opposition to the Chechen war in the election season. (Later, the Kremlin employed similar legal manoeuvrers to take over the independent NTV, TV-6 and TVS networks.)

After VTsIOM's management was forcibly changed, Levada and some of his colleagues quit their jobs (and, moreover, the equipment and resources that they had used for 15 years) to start up a new private polling agency, which they named Analytical Service VTsIOM (or VTsIOM-A). VTsIOM-A was renamed "Yuri Levada Analytical Center" (or "Levada Center") in March 2004. There is conflicting data about response from other Russian sociologists to the breakup of VTsIOM. Some sources report that every sociologist left with Levada. Others claims they were silent, except for Grushin.

The Property Ministry, which was reorganizing VTsIOM on behalf of the government, welcomed the researchers' departure. "Now they [VTsIOM-A] can really become independent, step into the market and live according to the laws of the market, which include paying taxes and competition", said a ministry spokesman.

The new director of VTsIOM is Valery Fedorov (Валерий Федоров), then a political scientist in his late twenties with no experience in public opinion polls, formerly a director of Center of Political Trends (Центр политической конъюнктуры). Many sources refer to him as a member of the presidential administration, but this is not confirmed on his curriculum vitae. He has assembled a new VTsIOM staff, most of whom are little-known.

Lilia Shevtsova, an analyst at the Carnegie Moscow Center (established by the Carnegie Endowment for International Peace) who used VTsIOM statistics in her recent book Putin's Russia, said she was pleased Levada was trying to maintain the independence of his research. (Note: Oksana Yablokova, "Levada Leaves VTsIOM for VTsIOM", The Moscow Times, 10 September 2003. This article is cached by a Yabloko website at Oksana Yablokova. "Levada Leaves VTsIOM for VTsIOM-A". Archived from the original on 17 June 2011..)

When asked about VTsIOM management change during his visit to Columbia University in the United States in September 2003, Russian president Vladimir Putin was supportive of the change in management. Levada reportedly claimed that Putin disrupted at least three attempts to convince him that his approval rating is considerably lower than widely reported.

=== Foreign agent law and prosecution ===
In 2013 the Levada Center reported it received from 1.5% to 3% of its total budget from abroad. It was issued with a public warning that it would be eligible for listing as a 'foreign agent' under the recently passed Russian foreign agent law. Levada said it suspended foreign funding in 2013. After the Levada Center on 1 September 2016 published the results of a poll that had found a significant decline in support for the ruling United Russia party, the Russian Justice declared that the pollster was "performing the functions of a foreign agent". This barred it from work on the upcoming election. Levada's director stated that the designation may mean that Levada would be unable to continue its work as a pollster. "This manifests the increase in internal repressions carried out by the country's leadership," the center's director, Lev Gudkov, had told TV Rain, the New York Times reported, "If they won't cancel this decision, it will mean that the Levada Center will have to stop working, because you cannot conduct polls with such a stigma put on you."

A pro-Kremlin group, Anti-Maidan, sought the Levada Center's blacklisting, reported the Moscow Times in July 2016, adding on its website that Anti-Maidan had claimed that "commissioned by the U.S. military, this Russian investigative service [Levada] gathered information in Moscow and Russia's regions [and] Wisconsin University acted as an intermediary between the Pentagon and the Levada Center". The effort succeeded on 5 September 2016.

== Structure ==
The nongovernmental organization Levada Analytical Center was initially formed in 1987–1988 as the "All-Union Public Opinion Research Center" (VTsIOM). Due to some internal changes it was re-established in 2003 as an independent nongovernmental organization.

The center carries out public opinion and research polls in fields such as sociology, economics, psychology and marketing. With approximately 50 people in the Moscow office, 80 fieldwork supervisors in regional branches and about 3000 trained interviewers, it is one of the largest full-service research agencies in Russia today.

The key personnel are the founders of the company who started their research programs at VTsIOM and continue in the Levada Center. From 2003 until 2006 the director was Yuri Levada, in December 2006 he was succeeded by Lev Dmitrievitsch Gudkov.

The basic research departments and their directors are:

- Social and Political – Boris Dubin
- Living Standards – Marina Krasilnikova
- Qualitative – Alexey Levinson
- Social and Economic – Lyudmila Khakhulina
- Marketing Research – Yuri Poletaev

== Relationships ==
The Levada Center has partner relationships with various regional research centers in Russia, the CIS and the Baltic states. Their partners and customers are nonprofit Russian and international companies. The center publishes the sociological journal The Russian Public Opinion Herald.

The Levada Center is a member of the international associations ESOMAR and ОIRОМ. Experts of the Levada Center are frequent participants in conferences and round-table discussions, such as the Liberal Mission Foundation (Фонд «Либеральная миссия»), the Carnegie Moscow Center, The Gorbachev Foundation, Memorial, Public Lectures of the Polit.ru Project (Публичные лекции Полит.ру), the Moscow Higher School of Social and Economic Sciences (Московская высшая школа социальных и экономических наук), the Public Center of A.D. Sakharov (Общественный центр им. А. Д. Сахарова) and Khodorkovsky Readings (Ходорковские чтения).

Articles, interviews and expert opinions published by the Levada Center appear regularly in domestic and foreign media, such as Kommersant, Vedomosti, The Economist, The Wall Street Journal, The New York Times, etc. Other publications in scientific and socially political press within Russia include Pro et Contra, Otechestvenie zapiski (Отечественные записки), Social Studies and the Present (Общественные науки и современность), The New Times, Ogoniok and Novaya Gazeta.

The center continues to carry out research programs and has developed in the framework of Russian Public Opinion Research Center. The center publishes the Journal of Public Opinion (from 1993 to 2003, the editorial staff of The Messenger created and published the journal Monitoring of Public Opinion: The Economic and Social Change - named after one of the major research programs, developed under the supervision of the academician Tatyana Zaslavskaya).

The Levada Center is included in the list of independent analytical centers of Europe published by Freedom House. Data published by the Levada Center has been used for The Economist Special Report on Russia. In collaboration with the Levada Center, Radio Free Europe/Radio Liberty weekly broadcasts the show Public Opinion (Общественное мнение: граждане России у микрофона Радио Свобода).

In 1988, the research team at what later became the Levada Center conducted the first study of consumer preferences in the USSR. At present, the center conducts a wide range of marketing and sociological research using a variety of research techniques.

== Research ==
Research by the Levada Center is based on regular Russia-wide public opinion surveys. Completed studies include:

- Homo Sovieticus (Russian: Советский человек). 5 waves of Russia-wide public opinion surveys in 1989, 1994, 1999, 2003 and 2008.
- Monitoring of Electoral Preferences in Russia, in 1993, 1995–1996, 1999–2000, 2003–2004, 2007–2008.
- Education program in workplaces on HIV / AIDS in Russia, commissioned by the International Labor Organization and the U.S. Department of Labor, 2005
- "Youth of Russia", 2005–2007
- "Western values and democracy", 2006
- "The relation of population to the police reforms", 2007
- "The European project on school studies on alcohol and drugs. ESPAD-2007
- "Opinion of HIV-positive mothers on the experience of receiving health and social care", commissioned by UNICEF, 2008
- "Reading in Russia – 2008. Trends and Issues. ", 2008
- "Russian Myths", 2008
- "Awareness of Russian citizens on the activities of law enforcement", 2008
- "The problem of quality education and the installation of permanent education in contemporary Russia"
- "Monitoring of elections to the Moscow City Duma in October 2009"
- Voices from Russia: Society, Democracy, Europe, 2006.
- "The Problem of "Elites" in Contemporary Russia". 2005–2006.
- Voices from Russia: What the Russian Middle Class Think about Their Own Country and about Europe, 2008.
- International Social Survey Program (ISSP), since 1991.
- New Russia Barometer, in collaboration with Centre for the Study of Public Policy (University of Strathclyde, University of Aberdeen), since 1991.
- World Public Opinion international surveys.

Most important current studies:

- International Program for the Social Studies International Social Survey Program "(ISSP), since 1991
- International research Inra Hooper / RSW / NOP-World / GfKNOP, since 1991
- Monitoring social and economic changes, bi-monthly, starting February 1993
- Regular participation in international studies World Public Opinion
- Index of consumer sentiment
- Index of social attitudes
- The index of financial sentiment (IFS, in collaboration with the Center of Macroeconomic Research of Sberbank, Russia)

== Reception ==
In 2015, the director of the Levada Center himself stated in 2015 that drawing conclusions from Russian poll results or comparing them to polls in democratic states was irrelevant, as there is no real political competition in Russia, where, unlike in democratic states, Russian voters are not offered any credible alternatives and public opinion is primarily formed by state-controlled media, which promotes those in power and discredits alternative candidates.

In 2016 Levada Center was classified as a foreign agent by the Russian justice ministry.

In 2022 an LSE blog said "The most reputable public opinion data available in Russia are from the Levada Center, a non-governmental research organisation conducting regular surveys since 1988." As of 2022, many respondents in Russia do not want to answer pollsters' questions for fear of negative consequences. In 2022, Sam Greene, director of the Russia program at King's College London, criticized Levada Center, saying that Levada should have published what percentage of respondents refused to participate.

== See also ==
- Pussy Riot
