= Michel Heller =

Russian historian (1922–1997)

Michel Heller (Russian: Михаил Яковлевич Геллер, romanized: Mikhail Yakovlevich Geller, August 31, 1922, Mogilev, Byelorussian SSR – January 3, 1997, Paris, France) was a Russian historian, journalist and critic. Author of several books that explore different aspects of Russian history and literature of the Soviet period, published in England, France, Poland, Hungary and other countries. He has proved an authority in the field of modern Russian literature, and the modern history of Russia. His works are better known outside Russia. Author of a monograph on homo sovieticus, social engineering and propaganda in the USSR titled "Cogs in the Wheel: The Formation of Soviet Man".
