= Novosibirsk Report =

Report on Soviet Union agriculture

The Novosibirsk Report, which many scholars consider one of the first signs of perestroika, was the name given in the West to a classified paper ("for internal use only") prepared under the direction of Tatyana Zaslavskaya of the Novosibirsk Institute of Economics which addressed the crisis in the agriculture of the Soviet Union. It was the theme of a closed conference in Novosibirsk in April 1983 and leaked to the Washington Post which published it in August.

Although expressed in terms of Marxist theory, this paper, an outline of a proposed research project to study the social mechanisms of economic development as exemplified in Siberian agriculture, was sharply critical of current conditions.

The conference was organized by the Sociology Department of the Institute of Economics and Industrial Engineering of the Soviet Academy of Sciences to discuss the report prepared under the direction of Zaslavskaya that considered lagging of "production relations" (производственные отношения) with respect to "production forces" (производительные силы) in the country.

Mikhail Gorbachev discussed this report within the higher echelons of the Soviet Communist Party, and it is believed that this report was the basis of Gorbachev's criticism of "administrative methods" in the economic management at the 27th Party Congress, which initiated perestroika.
