= Homo Sovieticus =

Critique of Eastern Bloc society

Homo Sovieticus (cod Latin for 'Soviet Man') is an anti-communist pejorative term coined to describe the average conformist individual in the Soviet Union and other Eastern Bloc countries. Popularized by Soviet writer Aleksandr Zinovyev, it gained negative connotations and represented the perceived outcome of Soviet policies.

Characteristics of Homo Sovieticus included indifference to work results, lack of initiative, indifference to common property, chauvinism, obedience to government, and a tendency to drink heavily. The term reflected a departure from the idealized "New Soviet man" concept promoted by the Soviet system.

Historians and sociologists, such as Michel Heller and Yuri Levada, defined Homo Sovieticus by traits like indifference, theft, lack of initiative, and submission to authority. The concept sparked debates about its empirical basis and continued existence in post-Soviet Russia, with opinions varying on whether it was a valid characterization or a biased ideological construct.

Some argued that the disappointment of intellectuals in the Soviet project had negative consequences, contributing to elitism and an anti-populist stance. The Economist noted that post-communism, the hope for Western values in Russia underestimated the extent of economic and moral damage after decades of Soviet rule.

A synonym of Homo Sovieticus is Sovok.

== Characteristics ==
The idea that the Soviet system would create a new, better kind of Soviet people was first postulated by the advocates of the system; they called the prospective outcome the "New Soviet man". Homo Sovieticus, however, was a term with largely negative connotations, invented by opponents to describe what they saw as the real result of Soviet policies. In many ways it meant the opposite of the New Soviet man, someone characterized by the following:

- Indifference to the results of his labour (as expressed in the saying "They pretend they are paying us, and we pretend we are working").
- Lack of initiative and avoidance of taking any individual responsibility for anything. Jerzy Turowicz wrote: "it's a person enslaved, incapacitated, deprived of initiative, unable to think critically; he expects – and demands – everything to be provided by the state, he cannot and doesn't want to take his fate in his own hands".
- Indifference to common property and to petty theft from the workplace, either for personal use or for profit. A line from a popular song, "Everything belongs to the kolkhoz, everything belongs to me" ("всё теперь колхозное, всё теперь моё" / vsyo teperь kolkhoznoe, vsyo teperь moyo), meaning that people on collective farms treasured all common property as their own, was sometimes used ironically to refer to instances of petty theft: "Take from the plant every nail, you are the owner here, not a guest" ("Тащи с завода каждый гвоздь – ты здесь хозяин, а не гость" / taschi s zavoda kazhdyj gvozd' – ty zdes' hozyain, a ne gost').
- Chauvinism. The Soviet Union's restrictions on travel abroad and strict censorship of information in the media (as well as the abundance of propaganda) aimed to insulate the Soviet people from Western influence. There existed non-public "ban lists" of Western entertainers and bands, which, in addition to the usual criteria of not conforming to fundamental Soviet values, were added to the list for rather peculiar reasons; one such example being the Irish band U2, the name of which resembled that of Lockheed U-2, a high-altitude U.S. reconnaissance airplane. As a result, "exotic" Western popular culture became more interesting precisely because it was forbidden. Soviet officials condemned this fascination by the Western culture as "Idol worshiping the West" (идолопоклонство перед Западом / idolopoklonstvo pered Zapadom).
- Obedience to or passive acceptance of everything that government imposes (see authoritarianism).
- In the opinion of a former US ambassador to Kazakhstan, a tendency to drink heavily: "[a Kazakh defence minister] appears to enjoy loosening up in the tried and true Homo Sovieticus style – i.e., drinking oneself into a stupor".

According to Leszek Kolakowski, the Short course history of the CPSU(b) played a crucial role in forming the key social and mental features of the Homo Sovieticus as a "textbook of false memory and double thinking". Over the years, Soviet people were forced to continuously repeat and accept constantly changing editions of the Short course, each containing a slightly different version of the past events. This inevitably led to forming "a new Soviet man: ideological schizophrenic, honest liar, person always ready for constant and voluntary mental self-mutilations".

The "Soviet man" is characterised by his tendency to follow the authority of the state in its assessment of reality, to adopt an attitude of mistrust and anxiety towards anything foreign and unknown, and is convinced of his own powerlessness and inability to affect the surrounding reality; from here, it is only a step towards lacking any sense of responsibility for that reality. His suppressed aggression, birthed by his chronic dissatisfaction with life, his intense sense of injustice and his inability to achieve self-realisation, and his great envy, all erupt into a fascination with force and violence, as well as a tendency towards "negative identification" – in opposition to "the enemy" or "the foreigner". Such a personality suits a quasi-tribal approach to standards of morality and law (the things "our people" have a right to do are condemned in the "foreigner").

— "Conflict-dependent Russia. The domestic determinants of the Kremlin's anti-western policy", Maria Domańska

== Opinions ==
Historian Michel Heller asserted that the term was coined in the introduction of a 1974 monograph "Sovetskye lyudi" ("Soviet People") to describe the next level of evolution of humanity, where the USSR becomes the "kingdom of freedom", the birthplace of "a new, higher type of Homo sapiens – Homo sovieticus". He defined Homo Sovieticus as a set of qualities and character traits characteristic of all Soviet people in varying proportions. According to Geller, the Soviet-type system, carrying out "social training", promotes the development, growth and dominance of these qualities. Geller listed the following features of the "Soviet man", as they were officially described by the Soviet ideology: the primary importance of work; boundless devotion to the Motherland; membership in the collective; constant interest in the life of neighbors, from housemates to neighbors on the planet; the state takes full care of this person. Geller believed that if you remove the advertising rhetoric, then these features completely coincide with the description of Zinovyev, and cited the following version of the text from the book Homo Sovieticus:

Homo sovieticus is accustomed to live in relatively bad conditions, is ready to face difficulties, constantly expects the worst; approves of the actions of the authorities; seeks to prevent those who violate habitual forms of behavior, fully supports the leadership; has a standard ideologized consciousness; a sense of responsibility for his country; is ready to sacrifice and is ready to condemn others to sacrifice.

According to the English Slavist Frank Ellis, a former lecturer at the University of Leeds, the constant attacks on reason, common sense and the rules of decency both distort and cripple both personality and intellect, and abolish the boundary between truth and falsehood. As a result, a Homo sovieticus, full of fear and devoid of intellectual initiative, is formed, which is "a mouthpiece for Party ideas and slogans, it is not so much a human being as a vessel that is filled and emptied at the direction of the Party".

In their articles and lectures, the sociologist Yuri Levada and members of his group Levada Center attributed the following to the typical negative features of Homo sovieticus:

- indifference to the quality of their work;
- theft from workplaces;
- lack of initiative and avoidance of any personal responsibility;
- understated ambitions;
- uncomplaining submission to any actions of the authorities, adaptability;
- willingness to carry out any, even immoral orders;
- propensity to drink;
- suspicion;
- guile.

In a number of his works, Levada described the negative personal qualities inherent in the Soviet man and, summing up many years of research, expressed confidence that the Soviet man as a type of personality did not disappear with the collapse of the USSR, but continues to exist in modern Russia and be reproduced in new generations. Moreover, according to the scientist, cynicism and an increase in the level of aggression were added to such negative features as social hypocrisy, paternalism, suspicion and isolationism. According to Levada, these negative changes were again the result of restrictions on public freedoms, as well as distorted economic and moral incentives introduced by the new Russian authorities. As one of the surveys of the study showed, by 2004, the number of people who believe that Russians are no different from residents of other countries has significantly decreased and the number of those who consider Russia a "besieged fortress" surrounded by enemies has increased.

Sociologist M. E. Gabovich, criticizing Levada's research, notes that the researchers did not try to empirically establish the existence of a "Soviet man", but simply, without any justification, declared Soviet society composed of people of a certain "anthropological type", in contrast to Western society, where it is customary to distinguish different types. The purpose of the research was not the question of the specific weight of any type in the population, but only a description of its features. According to Gabovich, the thesis about the very existence of the Levada concept of the Soviet man should first be proved by empirical research, and not postulated. According to Gabovich, the task of Levada and his staff is to "prove the unmodernization of Russia" associated with the idealization of the West, which they have preserved since the 1970s, when, according to L. D. Gudkov, "all mental work in intellectual circles fit into the framework of a neurotic comparison of their real life and vaguely imagined, but seemed reasonable and an orderly life 'there', in a 'normal society'".

According to the Russian scholar-educator Nikolay Nikandrov, the expression Homo sovieticus is an insulting name invented by the critics of Soviet power for the "new man" mentioned as part of the new anthropological construct whose development was declared in the Soviet Union ("Soviet people").

The contemporary American and Russian sociologist and social anthropologist Alexei Yurchak believed that the constant reference to the expression Homo sovieticus in Western academic and publicist discourse manifested assumptions that socialism was "bad", "amoral" or "imposed", expressing ideas about the existence of socialism as such in the Soviet Union and, accordingly, about the inevitable collapse of the Soviet Union.

According to philosopher Artem Magun, the disappointment of a group of Russian intellectuals including Zinovyev and Levada in the Soviet project had extremely negative consequences in the 1970s: elitism in the Soviet intelligentsia and the emergence of an anti-national and anti-populist pathos ("we are heavenly men, we think, but there is gloom and some anthropological degenerates around"). Despite the intellectuals' hypothetical affiliation with the Homo sovieticus, this approach was just a pretense, Magun concluded. Magun concludes that the hostility of the intelligentsia towards the people was the cause of its subsequent (in the 1990s) betrayal, which in turn led to the counter-attack of "Putinist populism".

According to the British weekly The Economist, which devoted a large article to the concept of Homo sovieticus in 2011, after the fall of communism in 1991, both in Russia and in the West, there was hope that Western moral values would take root in Russia, and the country would eventually become one of the developed countries of the world. But, according to journalists, this point of view did not take into account the degree of destruction of the Russian economy, the magnitude of mental exhaustion of people and the depth of moral decay after 70 years of Soviet power. No one had any idea what type of state would replace the USSR and what it meant to "be Russian".

In a book published in 1981, but available in underground samizdat in the 1970s, Zinovyev also coined an abbreviation homosos (гомосос).

== See also ==
- Authoritarian personality
- Brainwashing
- Heart of a Dog
- Idiocracy
- Mankurt
- New Soviet man
- Sovok
- Tibla
- Vatnik
