= Soviet people =

Citizens and nationals of the Soviet Union

Советский народ
- Flag of the Soviet Union

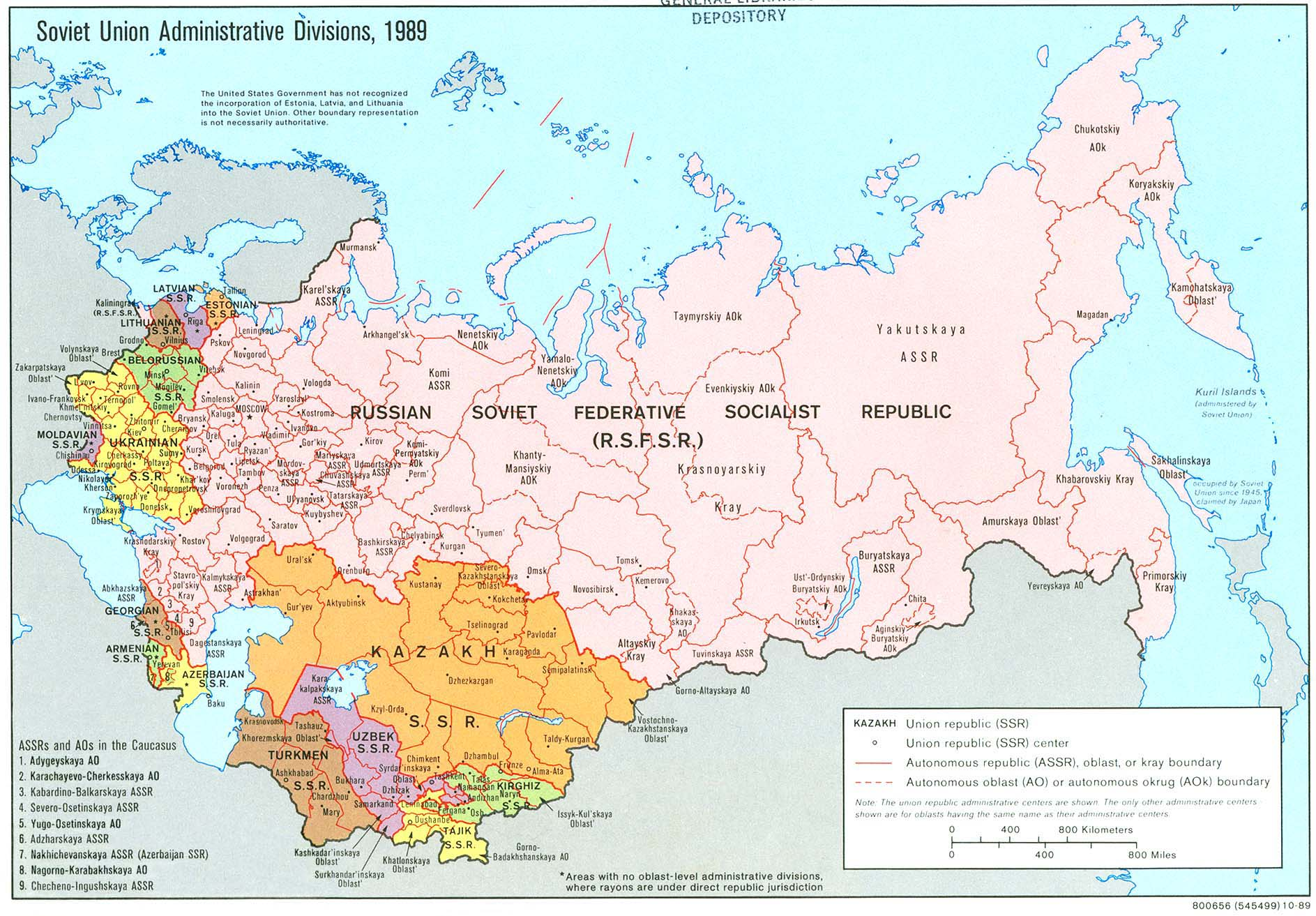
- Map of the country's constituent Union Republics in 1989

Total population
- 286,730,819 (1989 census)

Languages
- Russian, Ukrainian, Belarusian, Kazakh, Azerbaijani, Georgian, Armenian, Uzbek, Kyrgyz, Tajik, Turkmen, Latvian, Estonian, Romanian, Lithuanian, others (see: Languages of the Soviet Union)

Religion
- Christianity, Islam, Judaism, Buddhism, Atheism, others (see: Religion in the Soviet Union)

Related ethnic groups
- Citizens of the post-Soviet states

The Soviet people (Russian: сове́тский наро́д, romanized: sovetsky narod) was the demonym introduced in the ideology of the Soviet Union as the "new historical unity of peoples of different nationalities" (новая историческая общность людей различных национальностей) in reference to the citizens of the Soviet Union.

== Nationality policy in the Soviet Union ==
During the history of the Soviet Union, different doctrines and practices on ethnic distinctions within the Soviet population were applied at different times. Minority national cultures were never completely abolished. Instead the Soviet definition of national cultures required them to be "socialist by content and national by form", an approach that was used to promote the official aims and values of the state. The goal was always to cement the nationalities together in a common state structure. In the 1920s and the early 1930s, the policy of national delimitation was used to demarcate separate areas of national culture into territorial-administrative units, and the policy of korenizatsiya (indigenisation) was used to promote involvement non-Russian nationalities in government on all levels and strengthen non-Russian languages and cultures. By the late 1930s, however, the policy was changed to a more active promotion of the Russian language and later to more overt Russification, which accelerated in the 1950s, especially in Soviet education. Although some assimilation did occur, it did not on the whole succeed. The continued development of the many national cultures in the Soviet Union led to the drafting of the New Union Treaty in 1991 and the subsequent dissolution of the Soviet Union.

== Researchers' assessments ==
Assessments of the success of the creation of the new community are divergent. On the one hand, the ethnologist V. A. Tishkov and other historians believe that "for all the socio-political deformities, the Soviet people represented a civil nation." The philosopher and sociologist B. A. Grushin noted that sociology in the USSR "recorded a unique historical type of society that had already gone into oblivion". At the same time, according to the sociologist T.N. Zaslavskaya, it "did not solve the main task associated with the typological identification of Soviet society".

Some historians evaluating the Soviet Union as a colonial empire (Soviet empire), applied the "prison of nations" idea to the USSR. Thomas Winderl wrote: "The USSR became in a certain sense more a prison-house of nations than the old Empire had ever been."

In an interview with Euronews in 2011, Russian President Dmitry Medvedev recalled the use of the term "Soviet people" as a "unified community" in the Soviet Union but added that "these constructions were largely theoretical".

== See also ==
- Homo Sovieticus
- Genocide of the Soviet people
- Melting pot
- New Soviet man
- Orthodoxy, Autocracy, and Nationality – the ideological doctrine of Russian emperor Nicholas I
- Rootless cosmopolitan
- Russification
- Sovok
- Zhonghua minzu – the equivalent notion in the People's Republic of China
- Yugoslavs
