= Boris Grushin =

Boris Andreevich Grushin (Russian: Бори́с Андре́евич Гру́шин; 2 August 1929, in Moscow – 18 September 2007, in Moscow) was a well-known Soviet and Russian philosopher, sociologist and historical and sociological scientist. He is generally seen as the pioneer of public opinion polling in the Soviet Union more than thirty years before its breakup. Prominent American novelist Olga Grushin is his daughter.

== Life and scientific activity ==
Grushin graduated from the Faculty of Philosophy of the Lomonosov Moscow State University in 1952 with a dissertation on The Logical and Historical Problem in Marx's Capital. In 1957 he completed his postgraduate study in the same place, with a thesis on Receptions and Ways of Reproducing the Thoughts of Historical Development.

At the same time in 1952 Grushin was one of the founders of the Moscow Logic Circle. Other members who entered the circle included Aleksandr Zinovyev, Merab Mamardashvili and Georgy Schedrovitsky. It was later called the Moscow Methodological Circle (ММК).

In 1960 he founded the Institute of Public Opinion at the newspaper Komsomolskaya Pravda where problems within the Soviet Union were brought to daylight and analyzed through public opinion surveys for the very first time.

In 1967 Grushin received a doctorate in philosophy from the Institute of Philosophy of the Academy of Sciences of the Soviet Union for his work concerning the Problem of Methodology while Researching Public Opinion. He decided to leave the newspaper work afterwards and devoted himself to several different projects.

Between 1962–1965 and 1977–1981 Grushin was an employee of the journal Problems of Peace and Socialism in Prague, Czechoslovakia. In the years of 1967–1968 and 1982–1989 he worked at the Faculty of Journalism of the Lomonosov Moscow State University.

In the two years from 1988 to 1990 he was one of the organizers and directors of the All-Soviet Center for Public Opinion Studies (VCIOM), which gave him the chance to expand his work on public opinion surveys.

Meanwhile, in 1989, Grushin created the Service of studying of public opinion Vox Populi the first detached and completely private opinion center in the Soviet Union.

Between all his projects Grushin worked at several academic centers such as the Institute of Sociological Researches and the Central Economic Mathematical Institute. He taught at different universities in Russia and the US and in 1993 worked as one of the advisers of president Boris Yeltsin.

In 2003 Grushin received the award of the Union of Russian Journalists for "journalistic skills" in his book Four Lives of Russia.

Grushin died on September 18, 2007, in Moscow.

Long after his death Boris Grushin will be remembered as one of the founding fathers of Russian sociology who firmly worked towards the recognition for sociology as a scientific discipline. Some of his pupils and followers include J. Kapeljush, V. Sazonov, T. Dridze, A. Zhavoronkov, A. Vozmitel, V.Korobejnikov, E. Andrjushchenko, V. Tokarovsky, E. Avraamova, L. Byzov and many more.
