= Tatyana Zaslavskaya =

Russian sociologist and economist (1927–2013)

- Татьяна Заславская
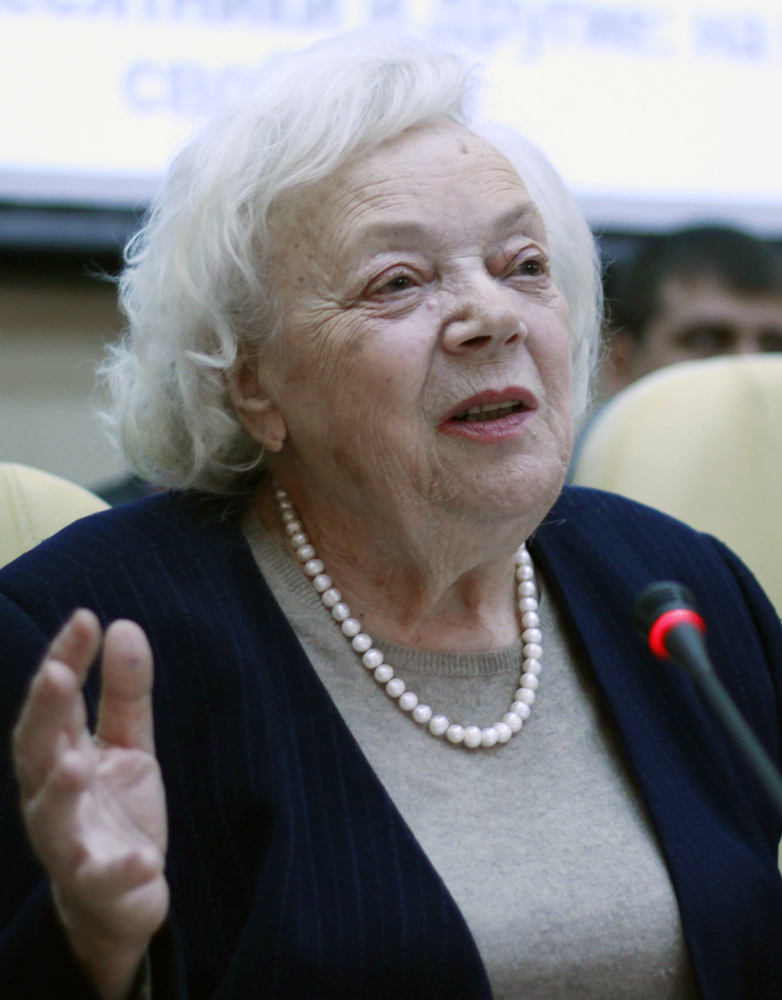
- Zaslavskaya in 2011
- Born: Tatyana Ivanovna Zaslavskaya; April 9, 1927; Kyiv, Ukrainian SSR, Soviet Union
- Died: August 23, 2013 (aged 86); Moscow, Russia
- Education: Moscow State University
- Occupations: Sociologist, economist

Tatyana Ivanovna Zaslavskaya (Russian: Татьяна Ивановна Заславская; April 9, 1927 – August 23, 2013) was a Russian economic sociologist and a theoretician of perestroika. She was the prime author of the Novosibirsk Report and several books on the economy of the Soviet Union (specializing in agriculture) and in sociology of the countryside. She was a member of the Consulting Committee to the President of Russia from 1991 to 1992 and also a member of the Russian Academy of Sciences. Zaslavskaya was the founder of RPORC and also its director in the years from 1987 to 1992. In 2000 she was the Laureate of the Demidov Prize and the honorary president of the Levada Center.

== Biography ==
Tatyana Zaslavskaya was born in Kyiv in 1927 and brought up in Moscow. She studied at the Physics Department of Moscow State University for three years, and then graduated from the Economics Department of the university in 1950. She finished her post-graduate study at the Institute of Economics of the Academy of Sciences of the Soviet Union with the degree of Kandidat in 1956 under the supervision of Professor Vladimir Venzher (Владимир Григорьевич Венжер). In 1963 she joined the Novosibirsk Institute of Economics headed by Abel Aganbegyan (Абел Аганбегян) to work in a command of young and talented scientists. In 1965 she did her Doctorate in Economics and in 1968 she was elected an Associate Member (член-корреспондент) of the Academy of Sciences of the Soviet Union.

== Research ==
The analysis of the economic situation in Soviet agriculture led Zaslavskaya to the conclusion that the revealed problems cannot be explained without sociological analysis, which bordered with blasphemy within the canonical Marxist science, which postulated that the development of the society is derived from the economical relations, and not vice versa. At these times Soviet sociology was under the tight scrutiny of the Communist Party (from the position of bourgeois pseudoscience through a brief period of liberalisation during the Khrushchev Thaw to sharp criticism during the Leonid Brezhnev era). The remoteness and relative scientific freedom of the young department of the Academy of Sciences of the Soviet Union at Novosibirsk allowed Zaslavskaya to do her research in sociology of the agricultural sector by studying the Siberian countryside, Altai Krai in particular.

In the later years of the Soviet Union accurate detailed information regarding conditions in Soviet agriculture was considered a state secret when not censored outright. A major breach in security occurred in 1983 when the details of a classified paper, "for internal use only", the report from the closed conference in Novosibirsk by Tatyana Zaslavskaya regarding the crisis in Soviet agriculture, were published in The Washington Post. It was called "О совершенствовании социалистических производственных отношений и задачах экономической социологии" ("About the perfection of socialist relations of production and problems of economic sociology") and was next to the United States also published in Germany. In the USSR all copies of the “Novosibirsk manifesto” were withdrawn by the KGB. Later it became known as the Novosibirsk Report in the West and was often considered one of the first signs of perestroika. Although expressed in terms of Marxist theory, this paper—an outline of a proposed research project to study the social mechanisms of economic development as exemplified in Siberian agriculture—was sharply critical of current conditions. Zaslavskaya was the author of a number of works in Russian which deal with economics and social conditions in Soviet agriculture although some of her work was suppressed by Soviet censors. For example, The Methodology of Comparing Labour Productivity in Agriculture in the USSR and the USA, written together with M.I. Sidorova, was suppressed due to its pessimistic results.

In 1988 Zaslavskaya came back to Moscow for the formation of the Russian Public Opinion Research Center, which she was the director of until 1992. Afterwards she became the honorable president of RPORC and later the honorable president of the Analytical Center of Yuri Levada (the Levada Center since 2004).

In 1993 she became the co-president of the Interdisciplinary academic center of social sciences (Russian: Интерцентра). Since 1993 the "Intercenter" has been carrying out ten annual international conferences concerning the question: "Where is Russia going?" under Zaslavskaya's direction. Many representatives of different sciences (historians, jurists, sociologists, economists, political scientists, culturologists, and philosophers) participate in these conferences debating topics such as a better judgment of the post-communist transformation processes or modern problems and prospects of development of the Russian society.

Zaslavskaya's arguments evolved over time. In the Second Socialist Revolution she imagined the possibility that the USSR was experiencing a democratic revolution that would make Russia genuinely socialist. In the next two decades she puzzled over the form and nature of the transition that actually took place in Russia arguing in 1999 that it was some kind of revolution but then in 2002 concluding that "there was no new social revolution in Russia." She saw social change as occurring through crises involving "random transformation" as in the 1990s the Yelt'sin group lost control of the situation. This led her to try to devise various analyses of social groupings and models of change which tended to description and classification.

She died in 2013 having left her role as a member of parliament twenty years before to teach and write. She was survived by her husband Mikhail and her daughter Oksana.

== Memberships and awards ==
- Member of: Academy of Europe, European-Mediterranean Academy, honorary member of the Polish Academy of Sciences, the doctor of philosophy of Oberlin college, member of the International sociological institute.
- Winner of: the Karpinsky award (Fund Tyopfera, 1989, Germany), the Demidov Prize (Demidovsky fund, 2000, Russia, Yekaterinburg), founder of the Novosibirsk economic-sociological school.
- She received Soviet orders: Order of the Badge of Honour (1972), Order of the Red Banner of Labour (1975), Order of Friendship of Peoples (1981), and Order of the October Revolution (1987).

== Publications ==
- Tatyana Zaslavskaya, The Second Socialist Revolution: An Alternative Soviet Strategy, US edition: (in "The Second World" book series) Indiana University Press, (1990), 241 pages, ISBN 0-253-36860-X, ISBN 0-253-20614-6 (paperback)
- "The Novosibirsk Report", Survey, vol. 28 (1984), no. 1 pp. 83–109.
- "The structure of social change in Russia. The purpose and the results of Russian reforms," Russian Social Science Review, vol. 43 no.3, (2002) Translation from Obshchestvo i ekonomika, 1999 (3–4).
- "The socio-structural aspect of the transformation of Russian society", Sociological Research, vol. 41 no. 6, (2002). Translation from Sotsiologicheskie issledovaniia, 2001(8) of Demidov lecture.
- "On the social mechanism of post communist transformation in Russia",Sociological Research, vol. 42 no. 6, (2003). Translation from Sotsiologicheskie issledovaniia, 2002(8).
- "Contemporary Russian society", Sociological Research, vol. 45 no. 4, (2006). Translation from Obschestvennye nauki i sovremennost, 2004(5).
