= New Soviet man =

Archetype of the ideal Soviet citizen

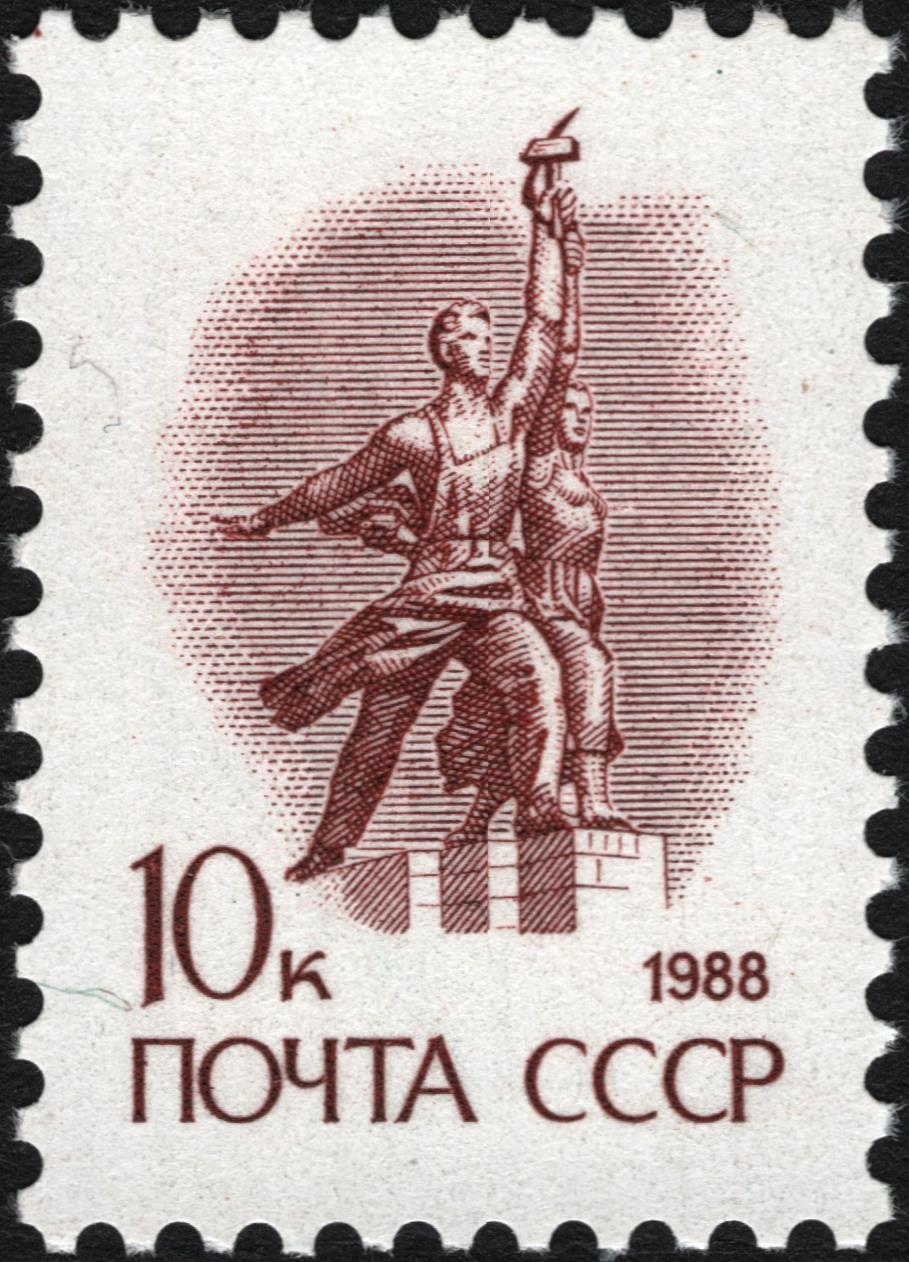
Worker and Kolkhoz Woman commemorated in a Soviet stamp in Socialist realist style

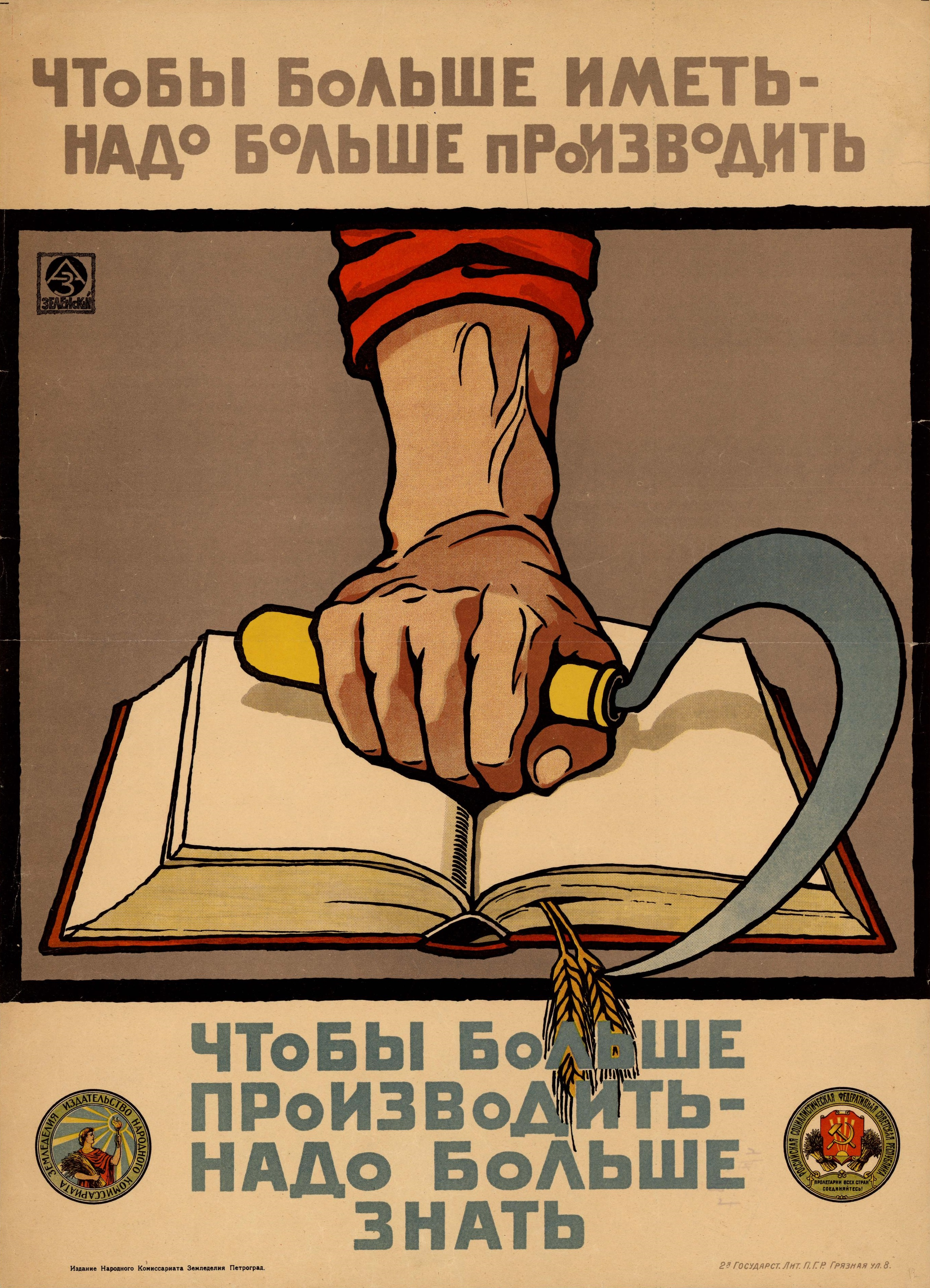
1920 propaganda poster: "In order to have more, it is necessary to produce more. In order to produce more, it is necessary to know more."

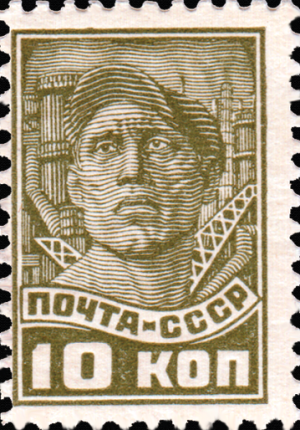
Image of industrial worker on a 1937 stamp

The New Soviet man or New Soviet person (Russian: новый советский человек, romanized: novy sovetsky chelovek), as postulated by the ideologists of the Communist Party of the Soviet Union, was an archetype of a person with specific qualities that were said to be emerging as dominant among all citizens of the Soviet Union, irrespective of the country's cultural, ethnic, and linguistic diversity, creating a single united Soviet people and Soviet nation.

== New Man ==
The Soviet man was to be selfless, learned, healthy, muscular, and enthusiastic in spreading the communist Revolution. Adherence to Bolshevism, and later Marxism–Leninism, and individual behavior consistent with those philosophies' prescriptions, were among the crucial traits expected of the New Soviet man, which required intellectualism and hard discipline. He was not driven by crude impulses of nature but by conscious self-mastery, a belief that required the rejection of both innate personality and the unconscious, which Soviet psychologists therefore rejected.

He treated public property with respect, as if it were his own. He should regard himself as being Soviet (culturally, ethnically, and linguistically) rather than Russian, Ukrainian, Belarusian, or any of the many other people and cultures found in the USSR.

His work required exertion and austerity, to show the new man triumphing over his base instincts. Alexey Stakhanov's record-breaking day in mining coal caused him to be set forth as the exemplar of the "new man" and the members of Stakhanovite movements tried to become Stakhanovites.

This could also be a new woman; Pravda described the Soviet woman as someone who had and could never have existed before. Female Stakhanovites were rarer than male, but a quarter of all trade-union women were designated as "norm-breaking." For the Paris World Fair, Vera Mukhina depicted a momentual sculpture, Worker and Kolkhoz Woman, dressed in work clothing, pressing forward with his hammer and her sickle crossed.

Alexander Zinoviev put forth the satirical argument that a new kind of person was indeed created by the Soviet system, but held that this new man - which they call Homo Sovieticus - was in many ways the opposite of the ideal of the New Soviet man.

=== Selflessness ===
Among the major traits of a new Soviet man was selfless collectivism. The selfless new man was willing to sacrifice his life for good causes.

This trait was glorified from the first Soviet days, as exemplified by lines from the poem Vladimir Ilyich Lenin by the Soviet poet Vladimir Mayakovsky:

Who needs a "1"?
The voice of a "1"
is thinner than a squeak.
Who will hear it?
Only the wife...
A "1" is nonsense.
A "1" is zero.

Fictional characters and presentations of contemporary celebrities embodying this model were prominent features of Soviet cultural life, especially at times when fostering the concept of the New Soviet man was given special priority by the government.

Pronatalist policies encouraging women to have many children were justified by the selfishness inherent in limiting the next generation of "new men."

== New Soviet Woman ==
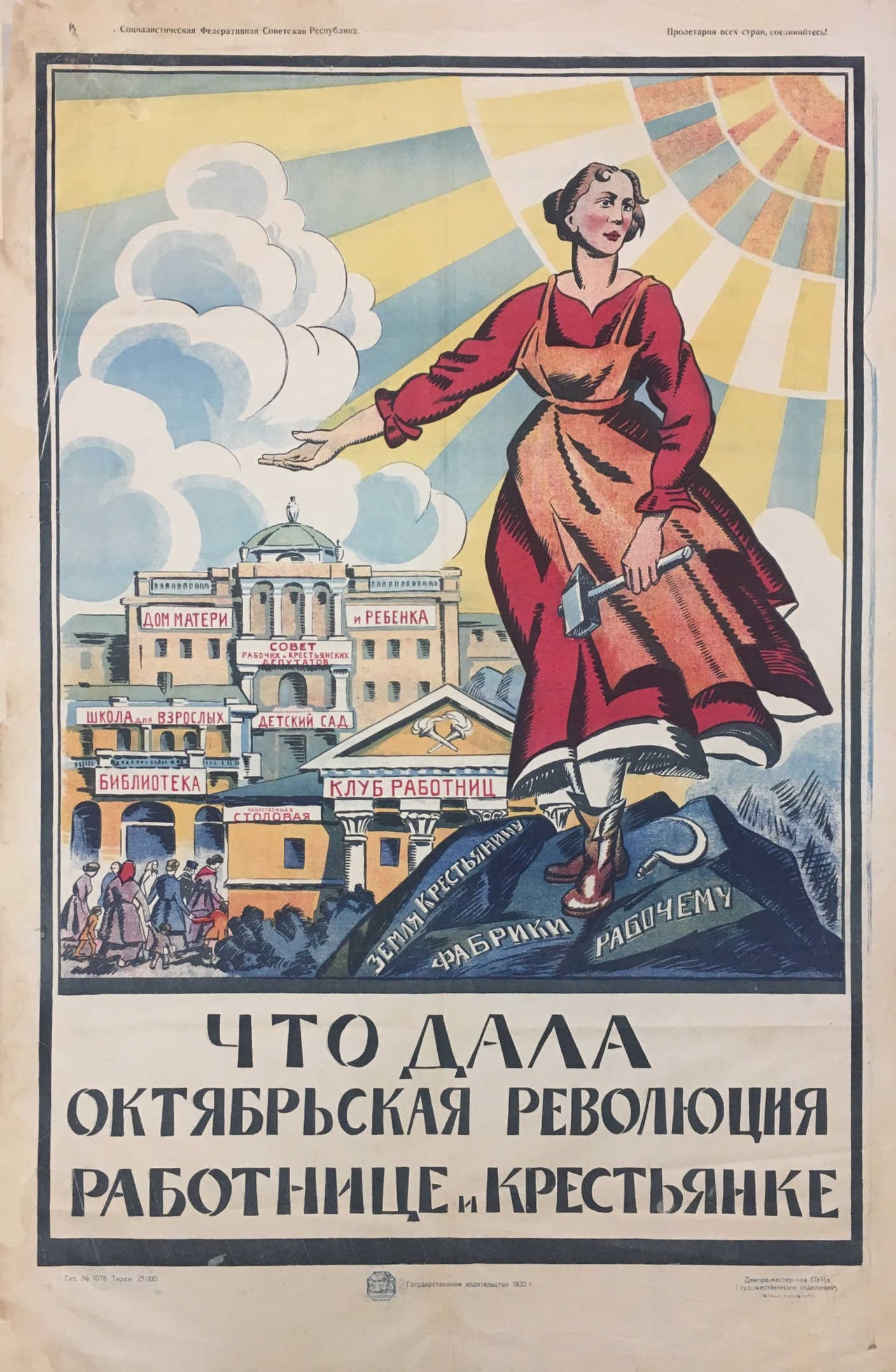
"What the October Revolution gave to the female worker and peasant". 1920 Soviet propaganda poster. The inscriptions on the buildings read "library", "kindergarten", "school for adults", etc.

In the 1920s and into the Stalinist era the concept of the "New Soviet Woman" served alongside that of the "New Soviet Man." Her roles were vastly different from those of her male counterpart; she was burdened with a complex identity that changed with ideology shifts in the party doctrine toward more conservative notions of the role of the family and the mother in the Soviet system. The New Soviet Woman was a Superwoman who balanced competing responsibilities and took on the burden of multiple roles: Communist citizen, full-time worker, wife and mother.

The New Soviet Person was generally characterized as male. In Soviet propaganda centered on the New Soviet Person, it was standard for men to be depicted as the primary actors, either battling opponents of the Marxist revolution or rebuilding the world. Women, on the other hand, were often portrayed as "backward," passive beneficiaries of the revolution rather than its securers. This was so partly because the proletarian movement was organized and fought by men of the working class. Thus, propaganda often equated male domination with proletariat domination over the bourgeoisie. Although the party leadership claimed the sexes enjoyed equal status under the law, a significant accomplishment in itself, men remained the measure of worth.

This marginalization of women in the newly developing civil order made it difficult for women to find a place among the proletarian class for which the revolution was fought. Regulations during the New Economic Policy period on the extent to which women could work in dangerous conditions, how many hours they could work in a shift and the kinds of special care they received during maternity made many factory owners reluctant to hire women, despite the Commissariat of Labor's requirements that women to be given equal access to employment.

There were gains made in combating illiteracy and promoting education for women during the 1920s. Soviet policy encouraged working-class women to attend school and develop vocational skills. There existed opportunities for women to participate in politics, become party members and vie for elected and administrative positions. Access to the political sphere, however, was extremely limited. In the long term, Soviet thought said that the organization of house communes, communal kitchens, nurseries, kindergartens etc. would allow a woman to "interest herself in all those matters which now interest the proletarian man", as opposed to full time domestic work and childcare.

Joseph Stalin's policies on women were more conservative than that of his predecessor Lenin. Because he was concerned with a declining population rate, Stalin de-emphasized the Marxist feminist view of women in society, which, in his view, freed women from patriarchy and capitalism. In keeping with the party line, Stalin reasserted the importance of women in the workforce and female education, primarily literacy, although he began to emphasize the role of mother in a way that differed from more radical notions of the early 1920s.

The "withering away" of the family was no longer a goal of economic and political progress. The new party line was that the family, like the state, was to grow stronger with the full realization of socialism. Massive propaganda campaigns linked the joys of motherhood with the benefits of Soviet power. Soviet ideology began to argue that woman's public role was compatible with her roles as wife and mother. In fact, that the two reinforced one another and were both necessary for real womanhood.

The New Soviet Woman differed greatly from the conceptions of revolutionaries preceding the 1930s. Instead of being freed from domestic concerns, she was bound to them. Though she now filled the role of man's peer in the workplace, she was also obligated to devote herself to being his helpmate in the home. One of the primary roles of the New Soviet Woman was that of mother. This role became of great importance in the wake of population decline beginning in the 1920s. War and revolution had decimated the population. Legislation legalizing abortions and the increasing use of contraception—though still not that widespread—in the 1920s also contributed to the lower population numbers as women began to work more and give birth less.

As a means to combat that trend, propaganda placed a new emphasis on the female's role as the perpetuator of the Communist regime in their ability to produce the next class of healthy workers, a policy called pronatalism. Propaganda presented pronatalism, a means to encourage women to bear children, in different ways to urban working-class women and to rural peasant women. Propaganda designed for an urban audience linked healthy female sexuality with reproduction while medical information to peasant women positioned conception as the purpose of sexual intercourse.

During the 1920s and into the Stalinist era, Soviet policy forced women to curtail their professional aspirations in order to fulfill their dual role as worker and housewife. Competing requirements of family life limited female occupational mobility. Women managed the role strain experienced during the Stalinist era by either a restriction of professional aspirations or by limiting family size. Despite pitfalls, unprecedented opportunities were available to lower-class women during this time. Women now had a voice in debates and the Zhenotdel, the women's section of the Central Committee from 1919 to 1930, made strides during its operation to increase political, social and economic agency of Soviet women.

== Consequences ==
A pejorative term Homo Sovieticus is used to describe the concept in countries of the former Eastern Bloc.

== See also ==
- Moral Code of the Builder of Communism
- Children of the revolution (concept)
- Engineers of the human soul, USSR & China
- Family in the Soviet Union
- Homo Sovieticus
- Let's trim our hair in accordance with the socialist lifestyle, North Korea
- New People, Cambodia
- Propaganda in the Soviet Union
- Soviet people
- Soviet patriotism
- Thought reform in China
- Model of masculinity under fascist Italy
- New Man (utopian concept)
- New Woman
- Transhumanism
- Übermensch
