= Yuri Levada =

Russian academic (1930–2006)

- Юрий Левада
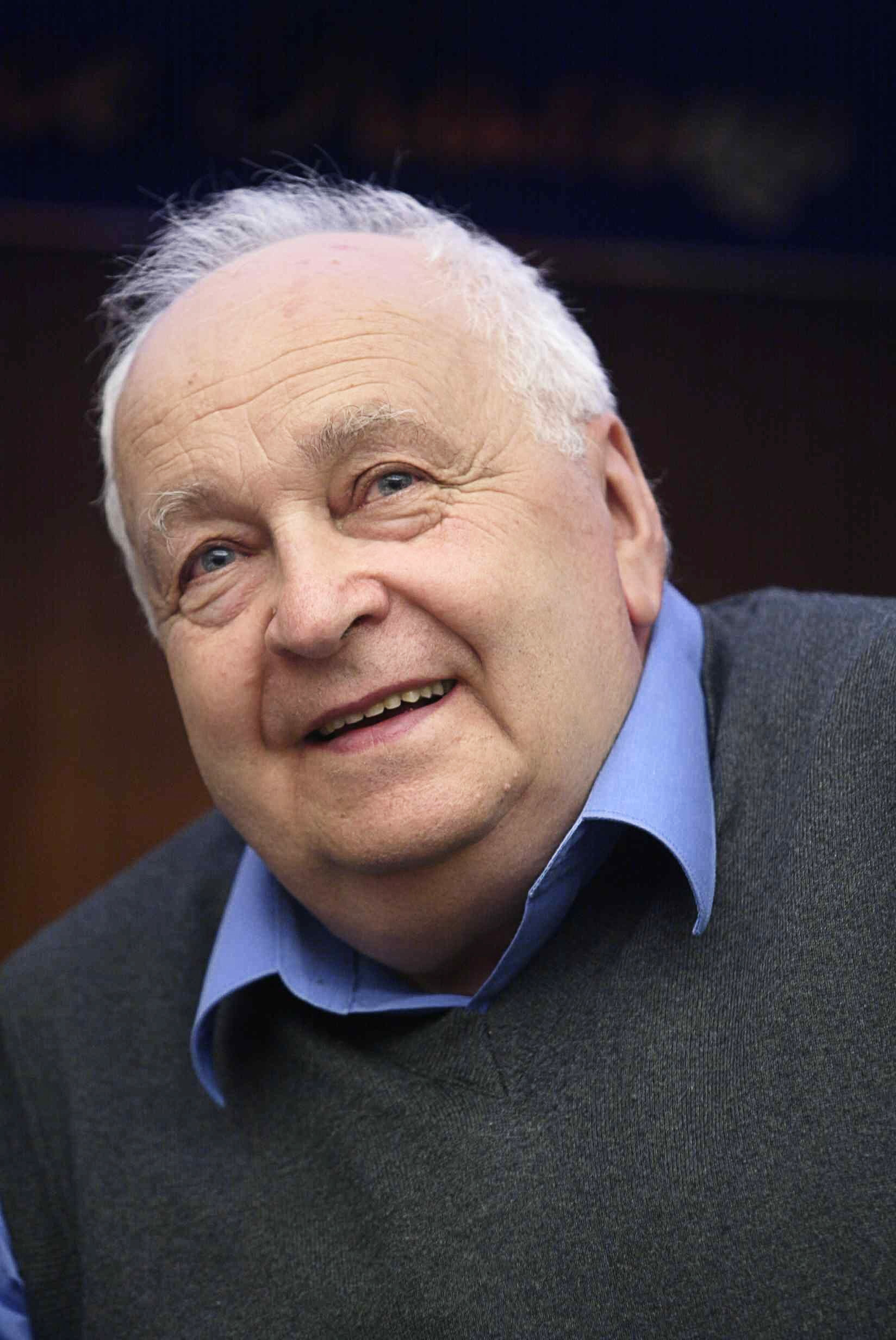
- Levada in June 2006
- Born: April 29, 1930; Vinnytsia, Ukrainian Soviet Socialist Republic, Soviet Union
- Died: November 16, 2006 (aged 76); Moscow, Russia
- Occupations: Sociologist and political scientist

Academic background
- Education: Moscow State University

Academic work
- Discipline: Sociology
- Institutions: Russian Academy of Science (1956–1988)

Yuri Alexandrovich Levada (Russian: Ю́рий Алекса́ндрович Лева́да; 24 April 1930 – 16 November 2006) was a well known Russian sociologist, political scientist and the founder of the Levada Center.

== Scientific activity to 1988 ==
In 1952, Levada graduated from the Philosophical faculty of the Moscow State University. He got a PhD in philosophy in 1966 with a dissertation on the sociological problems of religion.

From 1956 to 1988, Levada worked at the Russian Academy of Sciences (Russian: АН СССР). He was the first Russian professor to ever lecture sociology and did so at the faculty of journalism of the Moscow State University.

During the political thaw under Nikita Khrushchev, Levada was allowed to carry out limited surveys of public opinion. In one lecture, Levada had asserted that tanks could not change ideologies, a reference to the Soviet Union's 1968 invasion of Czechoslovakia. He also criticized, that few actually read Pravda's long editorials, and Pravda quickly and bitterly denounced the sociologist.

In 1969, Levada was deprived of his rank as a professor for ideological errors in his lectures. The "Institute of concrete social researches" (Russian: Институт конкретных социальных исследований), where Levada was responsible for the Theory and Methodology sector had to undergo a total political cleaning. In 1972, the institute was closed down during a Leonid Brezhnev-era purge of some 200 sociologists from research institutes and universities.

Levada started a new job at the Central Economic Mathematical Institute (Russian: Центральный экономико-математический институт). He started a methodological seminar which united supporters of many different scientific areas and was for a long time considered a semi-legal institution. In 1988 the core of employees of his former sector at Russian Academy of Sciences and members of his seminar helped him to set up the Russian Public Opinion Research Center (VCIOM).

In 2003, Levada together with all other employees left VCIOM due to internal problems and continued their work at the Levada Center.

Levada was voted Person of the year in 2004 by the "Analitika" («Аналитика») on the website Rambler.ru.

On 16 November 2006, Yuri Levada died and was buried in the Troyekurovskoye Cemetery.

== Work at VCIOM ==
From 1988 to 1992, Levada was the head of department for theoretical researches at VCIOM, under the direction of Tatyana Zaslavskaya. From 1992 to 2003 he was the director of VCIOM.

In 1994, he became the Chief Editor of the magazine «Social and economic changes: public opinion monitoring» (Russian: «Социальные и экономические перемены: мониторинг общественного мнения»). Since 1991 VTSIOM has published a series of researches on the presidential elections in Russia, elections of the State Duma and elections of legislative and executive powers of different regions of the country.

In the spring of 1993, the research program «Monitoring of economic and social changes» (Russian: «Мониторинг экономических и социальных перемен») developed under the direction of T.I. Zaslavskoj, was started. This program was based on regular sociological researches (six mass polls within the population per year). It provided material for the analysis of long-term numbers of sociological data about the relation of all levels of population within Russia to changes in the basic areas of social and economic life of a society.

In August 2003, the Russian Ministry for Property Relations decided to replace VCIOMs directors with government officials which allowed individuals and government structures to have control over the work of the centre. In return all employees of VCIOM quit their jobs and continued their researches under a new name — "VCIOM-A". After the Federal Antimonopoly Service of the Russian Federation banned this name, the organisation was renamed into the Levada Analytical Center (Levada Center).

== Levada Center ==
Since March 2004, the company has continued their work under the new name — the Analytical Center of Yuriy Levada ("Levada-centre"; Russian: Аналитический Центр Юрия Левады). It is carrying out public opinion - and research polls in such fields as sociology, economy, psychology, and marketing. The Levada-centre continues the research programs that were launched by its collective between 1990 and 2000. It annually publishes a year-book called "Russian Public Opinion" in Russian and English. The content of this year-book has been used for several publications in various mass-media.
