= Russian Public Opinion Research Center =

State-owned polling institution

- Abbreviation: VCIOM
- Formation: 1987; 39 years ago
- Type: State-owned organization
- Website: wciom.com

Russian Public Opinion Research Center (Russian: Всероссийский центр изучения общественного мнения, romanized: Vserossiysky tsentr izucheniya obshchestvennogo mneniya, abbr. ВЦИОМ, VCIOM) is a state-owned polling institution established in 1987, known as the All-Union Center for the Study of Public Opinion until 1992.

VCIOM is the oldest polling institution in post-Soviet Russia and one of Russia's leading sociological and market research companies. It was established in 1987 under the decree issued by VCSPS (All-Union Central Council of Trade Unions) and USSR State Committee of Labor as the All-Union Public Opinion Research Center (and in 1992 renamed the Russian Public Opinion Research Center). In 2003 VCIOM became an 'open joint-stock company with full state ownership'. VCIOM conducts "full cycle" marketing, social and political research, from instrument design and data collection to analysis and presentation of findings to its clients.

VCIOM branch offices operate in all seven of Russia's federal districts. Besides its own branches, Center has partnership agreements with a significant number of local regional research firms. VCIOM has its own interviewers’ network, which consists of about 5,000 people.

== Science and teaching ==
VCIOM holds the status of scientific institution. Besides that, there is a scientific Expert Council functioning in the Center, which consists of Russian sociologists, political scientists, marketologists, philosophers, and historians. VCIOM holds competitions of scientific works among young researchers.

Since 2003, it has published its own journal, called Monitoring of Public Opinion: Economic and Social Changes, which is issued six times a year. Since 2009 it has been available via open Internet access (both its Archive and recent issues). The Editorial Boarl includes leading Russian sociologists (Russian Academy of Science staff, Moscow State University, Russian State Social University, Higher School of Economics, Institute for Market Research GFK-Rus staff and others). There is VCIOM Department Chair in the Higher School of Economics that has been operating since 2008, and VCIOM Research Center in the Russian State Social University operating since 2008.

The Center designs and publishes monographs and edited volumes of sociological research devoted to the state of the public opinion in Russia. The recent monographs are: From Eltsin to Putin: three epochs in the historical consciousness of Russians (2007), Political Russia: pre-elections guide – 2007, Political Dictionary of The Present (2006), Russia on the Crossroads of the 2d Term (2005). For more details see: "VCIOM Library: some of the recent books" Public opinion research dating prior to 1992 are stored in an archive. The results of the public opinion polls "Express" since 1992 have been stored in “Archivist Database”.

VCIOM is the member of international professional networks including InterSearch and the Eurasian Monitor. It is guided by the European Society for Opinion and Market Research ESOMAR standards and norms. There are more than 70 specialists employed in the company headquarters in Moscow (with expertise in sociology, marketing, political science, finance, psychology, and statistics), as well as dozens in its offices around the country. The head of the Center is Valery Fedorov.

== History ==
=== Foundation (1987) ===
The Decree to launch VCIOM (All-Union in those times) was adopted at the July meeting of the Central Committee of the Communist Party of the Soviet Union in 1987. The founders were VCSPS (All-Union Central Council of Trade Unions) and USSR State Committee of Labour. The first director was Tatyana Zaslavskaya (academician). Zaslavskaya tells that the Institute of Demoscopy (Federal Republic of Germany) headed by Elisabeth Noelle-Neumann was taken as a model when establishing the Center.

Grushin made many efforts in 1987–1988 to set up a network of sociological centers in the Republics of the USSR and regions of Russia. That made possible to conduct the first mass surveys on a representative samples among adults in November 1988; a year later these surveys became systematical.

In 1988 Yury Levada together with his students (Lev Gudkov, Boris Dubin, Alexey Levinson and others) went to work in VCIOM (first as the head of the Theoretical Research Department and later – since 1992 as the head of the company). In an interview Yuri Levada talks about the first years of VTsIOM, refers to Tatyana Zaslavskaya (Татьяна Заславская) and Boris Grushin (Борис Грушин) as the founders of VCIOM in 1987 and states that he was invited by them to join VCIOM.

=== Growth, 1989–2003 ===
VCIOM became widely respected for its objectivity and professionalism among academics and journalists in both the Soviet Union and the West. In the 1990s, the agency's polls gained a reputation for being very reliable. During this period VCIOM had conducted over 1,000 polls.

Being the first sociological institution in the USSR (and Russia), VCIOM served as the cradle for numerous marketing and sociological centers of the country.

In August 1989 Boris Grushin left VCIOM to establish his own organization studying the public opinion "Vox Populi - Glas Naroda" (People’s Voice).

In 1992 the Public Opinion Foundation (FOM) that was originally established as a Division of the Center for raising charity funds, separated from VCIOM. In 1999 VCIOM achieved scientific institute status.

=== Conflict (2003) ===
Although VCIOM received no budget money and funded itself with private and public sector polling contracts (grants) from the breakdown of Soviet Union in 1992 to 2003, Levada had not addressed the fact that the polling agency remained a state-owned company as a FGUP (Russian abbreviation for: federal state unitary enterprise). In 2003 the Ministry of Property of the Russian Federation decided to transform FGUP VCIOM to JSC "Russian Public Opinion Research Center", 100% share of which was to be held by the state. There still would have been no budget allocated for it from the state and the company was to continue its work based on financing from both private and public institutions. However this change was taken by Yuri Levada as an attempt to affect the outcomes of VCIOM studies. As a result, the previous VCIOM employees left the company and followed Yuri Levada to the new established non-governmental Levada Center.

A young political scientist, Valery Fedorov headed the office. Some sources note that he was close to the administration of the president of the Russian Federation.

VCIOM carried on research programs introduced by its previous staff and continued to publish the Monitoring of Public Opinion journal; in 2003 former editorial board members began publishing a new journal called the Public Opinion Herald.

There is conflicting data about response from other Russian sociologists to the breakup of VCIOM. Some sources reported that every sociologist left with Levada while others claims they were silent, except for Grushin. The dispute over the legality of using the VCIOM brand in sociological community ended up in 2004 The Federal Antimonopoly Service decided to give VCIOM the full right of use of the brand "VCIOM" and prohibited Levada-Center to use it.

When asked about VCIOM management change during his visit to Columbia University in the United States in September 2003, Russian president Vladimir Putin was supportive of the change in management.

=== Present role as the state's main sociological research center ===
The research priorities today are political ratings, social mood indices, governmental programs, and reforms. VCIOM still conducts research for the most significant Russian private and public institutions. The applied and pragmatic focus of research programs is expressed in a change in its slogan: "Information for success!" instead of the former "From opinion – towards understanding".

== Criticism ==
The Center is sometimes criticized by its subjects of study. Gennady Zyuganov (leader of Communist Party of Russian Federation) criticized VCIOM's objectivity when evaluating media request results of VCIOM study on Lenin's Mausoleum stating "I think this is an unprofessional study". According to VCIOM, Russians supported burying Lenin's remains in a cemetery rather than keeping them in the mausoleum.

According to Berlin-based bne IntelliNews, VCIOM’s question about the 2019 Moscow protests was "subtly designed to give a result that supports the government’s point of view."

== Research ==
VCIOM conducts research on both regional and federal levels, as well as in the post-Soviet space (together with colleagues from the former USSR—members of "Eurasian Monitor" Agency) and other countries.

Topics of interest include:

- Politics: elections, politician approval ratings, protest potential
- Social sphere: education, health care, family, housing, corruption
- Business: finance and insurance, product and corporate brand development, corporate reputation, trademarks, IT and media, auto sector, real estate, sports industry

=== Methods ===
A wide range of research techniques, such as personal interviews, focus groups, mystery shopping, hall tests, exit polls, expert surveys, and telephone interviews, is used. Research methods include both descriptive and inferential statistical analysis, as well as sample building programs. Surveys based on a representative sampling are conducted every week on 1,600 people from 140 places throughout the 42 regions of Russia.

=== Selected projects ===
VCIOM regularly coordinates and implements international research projects for foreign and Russian customers such as UNDP, U.S. State Department, NATO Bureau in Moscow and others. Since 2004 the Center has actively participated in designing the system of regular sociological research in the post-Soviet area (in the framework of "Eurasian Monitor", VTsIOM is one of the founders of Eurasian Monitor as well as other sociological services in the former USSR republics.

- "Exit Polls at parliamentary and presidential elections" (client – "1st TV Channel") 2007–2008
- "Evaluation of the company-employer image" ("RosNeft") 2007
- "Evaluation of the company-employer image" ("Severstal") 2008
- "Evaluation of the company-employer image" ("RusAl – management company") 2007
- "Study on the Brand General Fame" ("Heineken-Commercial") 2007
- "Social Adaptation of HIV-infected: Estimating the situation in healthcare, education and employment" (UNDP) 2007
- "Study of national relationship upon the results of Nationwide surveys" (Institute for Diaspora and Integration) 2007
- "Study of entrepreneurial environment conditions, evaluation of business and power interaction" (RSPP) 2007–2008
- "Study of the level of trust of Russians towards mass media" (Office of the Public Chamber of Russia) 2007
- "Attitude of Russians towards Justice" (Office of the Public Chamber of Russia) 2007
- "Sociological research on unfair competition" (Federal Antimonopoly Service) 2007
- "Factors and perspectives of the development of football in Russia" (National Football Academy" Fund) 2006
- "Evaluation of housing attractiveness of investment project "Bolshoe Domodedovo" ("Coalco") 2006–2007
- "Study of the perception of NATO by Russians" (NATO Bureau in Moscow) 2006
- "Analysis and evaluation of the perception of corruption in the public sector by population" (UNDP and RF Accounting Chamber) 2006
- "Investment Behavior of the Population and Awareness about the Deposit Insurance System" (Deposit Insurance Agency) 2005–2006
- "Study on the perception of large pharmaceutical brands in Russia and Eastern European countries" (Stanton Beringer consulting), annually since 2005
- "Small enterprises functioning conditions in the regions of Russia" (OPORA Russia) 2004–2006
- "Evaluation of the reputational indicators" (Aeroflot – Russian Airlines), annually beginning since 2005
- "Syndicated research of corporate reputation of ten biggest companies of Russia", twice a year since 2004
- "Monitoring of the main indicators of social mood in post-soviet area countries". Participants: leading sociological services in 14 post-Soviet countries. Twice a year since 2003, in the framework of "Eurasian Monitor"

== See also ==
- Opinion poll
