= List of blogs =

This is a list of notable blogs. A blog (contraction of weblog) is a web site with frequent, periodic posts creating an ongoing narrative. They are maintained by both groups and individuals, the latter being the most common. Blogs can focus on a wide variety of topics, ranging from the political to personal experiences. Specific blogs include:

== List ==
Blog	Language	Subject	Author
3 Quarks Daily	English	Online news aggregator	S. Abbas Raza
AirlineReporter.com	English	Airline industry news	David Parker Brown
1000 Awesome Things	English	Miscellaneous topics	Neil Pasricha
The 9 on Yahoo!	English	Video blog on web videos	Multi-author
The Art Life	English	Blog about the art scene in Sydney, Australia	Multi-author
Ask a Manager	English	Workplace advice	Alison Green
Athletics Nation	English	Sports blog focusing on the Oakland Athletics baseball team	Tyler Bleszinski
Audimated	English	Music related blog focused on news, resources, and information for independent artists.	Lucas Sommer
Bad Astronomy	English	Blog on astronomy and science education	Phil Plait
Balkinization	English	Blog focusing on US civil liberties issues	Jack Balkin
Belle de Jour	English	Insight into the life of a London call-girl	Brooke Magnanti
Bestiario del balón	Spanish	Colombian football blog	Multi-author
Blog del Narco	Spanish	Mexican drug war	Anonymous
Blogcritics	English	Multiple sections, mostly involving entertainment and science	Multi-author
Bloggingheads.tv	English	Video blog on politics, philosophy, and science	Multi-author
The "Blog" of "Unnecessary" Quotation Marks	English	Blog about the misuse of English quotation marks	Bethany Keeley
The Blonde Salad	English	Fashion	Chiara Ferragni
Boing Boing	English	Politics, science fiction, and general interest	Multi-author
Borderland Beat	English	Mexican drug war	Multi-author
Brain Blogger	English	Multidimensional biopsychosocial perspectives	Multi-author
The Brussels Journal	English, Dutch	Conservative blog on Belgian politics	Paul Beliën
Cake Wrecks	English	Photoblog featuring images of cakes that are humorous or strange in appearance	Jen Yates
CampusJ	English	Jewish college news	Multi-author
Chinadialogue	Chinese, English	Blog on the environment, both globally and in China	Multi-author
Climate Audit	English	Using statistical methods to analyze historical reconstructions of past climates	Stephen McIntyre
The Comics Curmudgeon	English	Critical analysis of newspaper comics	Josh Fruhlinger
ConservativeHome	English	Conservatism from a UK perspective	Tim Montgomerie
Consumerist	English	Blog on consumerism	Multi-author
Contempo Magazine	English	Blog on Hispanic conservatism	Tony Magana
Core77	English	Blog dedicated to the practice and produce of the field of industrial design New York City	Stuart Constantine and Eric Ludlum
Cosmic Variance	English	Science blog on physics and astrophysics	Multi-author
Couric & Co.	English	Official blog of the CBS Evening News	The CBS Evening News staff
Crash Test Kitchen	English	Cooking and food video blog	Waz and Lenny (screen names)
Crooked Timber	English	Various intellectual topics, such as: Left-of-center politics, economics, sociology, and modern literature	Multi-author
Crooks and Liars	English	Liberal video blog	Multi-author
Cute Overload	English	Photos and videos of “cute” animals	Multi-author
The Daily Howler	English	Center-left political blog	Bob Somerby
Daring Fireball	English	Macintosh and technology blog	John Gruber
Deadspin	English	Sports blog	Multi-author
Diabetes Mine	English	Blog relating to diabetes	Amy Tenderich
Dlisted	English	Celebrity gossip	Michael K.
Down By The Hipster	English	Blog on the New York City nightlife	Multi-author
DrugWarRant	English	Blog used to advocate the termination of the war on drugs in the United States	Peter Guither
Durma Melhor	Portuguese	Blog on various issues related to sleep	Marcos Miguel
EastSouthWestNorth	English	China focused blog out of Hong Kong	Roland Soong
Engadget	English, Chinese (simplified Han), Chinese (traditional Han), Japanese, Spanish, Polish, Korean, German	Technology blog	Multi-author
EQ Music	English	Electronic pop music blog	Multi-author
Faces in Places	English	Photo blog of faces seen in everyday objects	Multi-author
/Film	English	Movie news and reviews	Peter Sciretta
Fluxblog	English	MP3 blog	Matthew Perpetua
Front Porch Republic	English	Localist blog	Multi-author
GamePolitics.com	English	Blog about the politics of computer and video games	Dennis McCauley
Gawker	English	Manhattan news and gossip	Multi-author
GeenStijl	Dutch	General commentary	Multi-author
Generación invisible	Spanish	Blog by professional journalists	Multi-author
Gigaom	English	Blog with opinions on startups, new technologies, broadband, and online games	Multi-author
Gizmodo	English, French, Dutch. Italian, German, Spanish, Japanese	Blog centred on Design, Technology and Consumer electronics	Multi-author
Go Fug Yourself	English	Comedy fashion blog	Jessica Morgan and Heather Cocks
Gothamist	English	Local interest blog about New York, branch sites cover other cities	Multi-author
Groklaw	English	Blog covering legal news pertinent to a free and open-source software community	Multi-author
Grumpy Old Bookman	English	Litblog	Michael Allen
Gulfsails	English	Documented the effects of Hurricane Katrina in New Orleans	Troy Gilbert
Hollaback!	English	Photoblog intended to raise awareness of street harassment	Multi-author
Hot Air	English	Center-right political and news blog	Multi-author
How the World Sees America	English	Blog showcasing views on the United States from around the world	Amar C. Bakshi
The Huffington Post	English	Liberal news blog	Multi-author
I Can Has Cheezburger?	English	Blog featuring lolcats and other animals created by the writers	Eric Nakagawa and Kari Unebasami
IPKat	English	Blog dedicated to intellectual property law	Multi-author
Idolblog	English	Blog dedicated to the talent search show New Zealand Idol	Multi-author
The Incidental Economist	English	Blog focused on economics, health policy, law	Multi-author
India Uncut	English	blog regarding India	Amit Varma
Inhabitat	English	Blog on sustainable architecture	Multi-author
IvyGate	English	News and gossip from Ivy League schools	Multi-author
Joystiq	English	Video gaming blog	Multi-author
Jezebel	English	Women's interest blog	Multi-author
Jihad Watch	English	Blog on the ideas behind Islamic jihad	Multi-author
Kaboom: A Soldier's War Journal	English	Military blog detailing a scout platoon leader's daily life on the Iraqi frontlines	LT G. (screen name)
Kissing Suzy Kolber	English	NFL humor blog	Multi-author
Kotaku	English	Video game blog	Multi-author
Language Log	English	Language blog	Mark Liberman
Law and the Multiverse	English	Law and comic books blog	James Daily and Ryan Davidson
Lifehacker	English	Blog covering life hacks	Multi-author
Little Green Footballs	English	Center-left political blog	Charles Foster Johnson
The Marmot's Hole	English	Blog focusing on Korean politics and society	Multi-author
Mashable	English, French	Social networking news based blog	Multi-author
Memepool	English	Link blog	Multi-author
MetaFilter	English	Link and general interest blog	Multi-author
Metro Jacksonville	English	Urban development news and discussion blog	Multi-author
Milblogging.com	English	Blog index to other military blogs	Multi-author
Mind Hacks	English	Psychology and neuroscience blog	Multi-author
Mini-Microsoft	English	Blog on Microsoft	Anonymous
Mr. Money Mustache	English	Personal Finance blog	Peter Adeney
The Monkey Cage	English	Political science research (2007–2022)	Multi-author
MSDN Blogs	English	Microsoft blog where employees blog to a public audience	Multi-author
Ms Sparky	English	News about defense contractors	Debbie Crawford
Music for Robots	English	MP3 Blog	Multi-author
MyDD	English	Progressive American politics blog	Multi-author
Node Magazine	English	Blog to annotate the novel Spook Country	Multi-author
The Oil Drum	English	Blog on energy issues	Multi-author
OpEdNews	English	Blog on U.S. and world political issues	Multi-author
Overheard in New York	English	Humor blog of conversations heard in New York	Multi-author
Overheard in Pittsburgh	English	Humor blog of conversations heard in Pittsburgh	Chris Griswold
The Panda's Thumb	English	Blog on the creation-evolution controversy	Multi-author
Patentlyo	English	Patent law blog	Dennis Crouch
Patribotics	English	Political investigative journalism	Louise Mensch
Pharyngula	English	Science blog	PZ Myers
Politically Incorrect	German and English	Political blog	Multi-author
Popjustice	English	Music blog	Peter Robinson
PopSugar	English	Gossip and celebrity news blog	Multi-author
ProBlogger.com	English	Blog tips	Darren Rowse
Protein Wisdom	English	Conservative and Libertarian political blog	Jeff Goldstein
The Psycho Ex-Wife	English	Blog on divorce in the U.S.	Anthony Morelli and Misty Weaver-Ostinato
Rate Your Students	English	Parody blog on the behavior of college students	Multi-author
ReadWrite	English	Blog on web technology	Richard MacManus
RealClimate	English	Blog on climatology	Multi-author
Retecool	Dutch	Shocklog	Multi-author
Rocketboom	English	Video blog	Andrew Baron and Joanne Colan
Sarcastic Gamer	English	Blog parodying the video game industry	Multi-author
The Sartorialist	English	Fashion blog	Scott Schuman
The Scientific Activist	English	Blog on science, politics, and science policy	Nick Anthis
SCOTUSblog	English	Blog on the Supreme Court of the United States	Multi-author
Seeking Alpha	English	Provides free stock market advice through a blog format	Multi-author
Sense on Cents	English	Provides information on financial markets and the economy	Larry Doyle
the show with zefrank	English	Comedy and current events video blog	Ze Frank
Simply Recipes	English	Cooking recipes	Elise Bauer
Skatter Tech	English	Technology review blog	Multi-author
Slugger O'Toole	English	Irish news blog	Mick Fealty
Smashing Magazine	English	Blog on web design and web development	Multi-author
The Sneeze	English	General interest blog	Steve (screen name)
The Soxaholix	English	Comic-based blog for discussing the Boston Red Sox	Hart Brachen
Spillpikene.no	Norwegian	Feminist game blog	Multi-author
Squawk Box	English	Blog for the CNBC show Squawk Box	Multi-author
Stuff White People Like	English	Satirical blog about the interests of upper class white Americans	Christian Lander
Supper Mario Broth	English	Educational entertainment content related to the Mario franchise	"Broth"
Surviving Grady	English	Boston Red Sox blog	Red and Denton (screen names)
TV Newser	English	American television news ticker blog	Multi-author
TechCrunch	English, French, Japanese	Blog covering Web 2.0 products and companies	Multi-author
The Tehran Times	English	Blog related to Iranian street fashion	Araz Fazaeli
Terra Nova	English	Blog related to game studies and virtual worlds	Multi-author
TorrentFreak	English	BitTorrent news blog	Ernesto (screen name)
TPMCafe	English	Center-left political blog portal	Multi-author
TrueHoop	English	Blog on basketball, primarily the NBA	Henry Abbott
The Underwear Expert	English	Men's underwear blog	Michael Kleinmann
Valleywag	English	Gossip and news on Silicon Valley personalities	Multi-author
Velvet Underground	Hebrew	Israeli news blog	Dvorit Shargal
Vlogbrothers	English	Multi-topic video blog which generally focuses on science, literature, pop culture, nerd culture, etc. The Green Brothers created a popular online community known as Nerdfighteria (Members of which are called Nerdfighters).	Hank Green and John Green
The Volokh Conspiracy	English	Conservative political blog written mainly by law professors	Multi-author
Wait But Why	English	Multi-topic blog focuses on science, nerd culture, and politics. Tim did an interview with Elon Musk in 2015.	Tim Urban
Watts Up With That?	English	Blog on global warming caused by human activity	Anthony Watts
Worldchanging	English	Blog pertaining to sustainability and social innovation	Multi-author
Yummly	English	Blog on food, recipes, and technology	Multi-author
Zen Habits	English	Blog on productivity, Getting Things Done, simplifying, living frugal, happiness, and related topics.	Leo Babauta
Zooillogix	English	Blog on zoology	Andrew and Benny Bleiman
