= Marmot (disambiguation) =

A marmot is a member of the genus Marmota.

Marmot may also refer to:

== People ==
- Janine Marmot, British film producer
- Sir Michael Marmot (born 1945), British scientist

== Places ==
- Marmot, Oregon, United States
- Marmot District, Gran Chimú, Peru
- Marmot Basin, a Canadian ski area
- Marmot Dam, a former dam in Oregon, United States
- Marmot Dome, the one dome east of Fairview Dome
- Marmot Island, an island in the Gulf of Alaska
- Marmot Mountain in Alberta, Canada
- Marmot Mountain (British Columbia), Canada
- Marmot Pass, a trail corridor in Washington state

== Other uses ==
- Marmot (company), an outdoor clothing and sporting goods company
- Marmot (grape), another name for the German wine grape Elbling
- The Marmot Review, a report on the social inequality in England (https://www.local.gov.uk/marmot-review-report-fair-society-healthy-lives)

== See also ==
- Marmot Day, a celebration featuring marmots
- La Marmotte, a one-day cyclosportive event
- Le Marmot (1976–1981), a French Thoroughbred racehorse and sire
- Cro-Marmot, a character from Happy Tree Friends
- Savoyard With a Marmot, painting by Antoine Watteau
- The Marmot's Hole, blog about Korea
