= Alan Sepinwall =

American television critic and writer (born 1973)

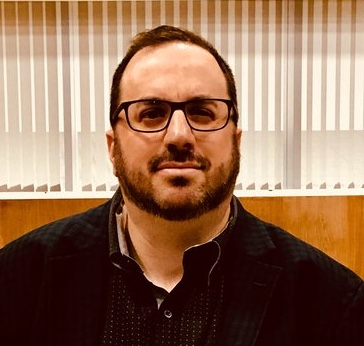
- Born: October 19, 1973 (age 53)
- Education: University of Pennsylvania
- Occupations: Television reviewer; writer
- Years active: 1994–present
- Employer: The Star Ledger (1994–2010) HitFix (2010–2016)/Uproxx (2016–2018) Rolling Stone (2018–2025); What's Alan Watching? (2025-)
- Children: 2

Alan Sepinwall (born October 19, 1973) is an American television reviewer and writer. He spent 14 years as a columnist with The Star-Ledger in Newark until leaving the newspaper in 2010 to work for the entertainment news website HitFix. He then wrote for Uproxx, where he worked for two years. From 2018 to 2025, he was the chief TV critic for Rolling Stone.

He now has a newsletter on the platform Ghost called What's Alan Watching?.

Sepinwall began writing about television with reviews of NYPD Blue while attending the University of Pennsylvania, which led to his job at The Star-Ledger. In 2007, immediately after The Sopranos ended, series creator David Chase granted his sole interview to Sepinwall. In 2009, Sepinwall openly urged NBC to renew the action-comedy series Chuck, and NBC Entertainment co-president Ben Silverman sarcastically credited Sepinwall for the show's revival.

Slate.com said Sepinwall "changed the nature of television criticism" and called him the "acknowledged king of the form" with regard to weekly episode recaps and reviews. Sepinwall and television critic Dan Fienberg hosted a podcast at HitFix called Firewall & Iceberg, in which they discussed and reviewed television until October 2015. During his time at Uproxx, Sepinwall hosted a podcast called TV Avalanche with fellow television critic Brian Grubb.

== Early life and education ==
Sepinwall grew up in Pine Brook, New Jersey. His father, Jerry, was a psychopharmacologist, and his mother, Harriet, is a former professor of social studies education at the College of St. Elizabeth in Morristown, New Jersey. Sepinwall attended Congregation Agudath Israel of West Essex in Caldwell, New Jersey. He studied at the University of Pennsylvania, where he began writing television reviews during his sophomore year in 1993. Sepinwall was later critical of his writings from this period, describing it as full of "misspellings, bad grammar and, even worse, observations that make me cringe".

== Career ==
In the 1990s, Sepinwall was a particular fan of the ABC police drama NYPD Blue and wrote reviews of the show on Usenet newsgroups. Those reviews helped lead Sepinwall to begin a career in television journalism at The Star-Ledger in Newark; in 2004, Sepinwall said "without Blue, I wouldn't have the career or the life that I currently do". However, after the 2020 murder of George Floyd by a Minneapolis police officer, Sepinwall wrote a long piece in Rolling Stone detailing his mixed feelings about NYPD Blue and cop shows in general, and concluding that shows in the police drama genre had to massively change in the new reality, or no longer be made at all.

=== The Star-Ledger ===
Sepinwall began working as The Star-Ledger's television columnist in 1996. He is a member of the Television Critics Association. Slate.com writer Josh Levin described Sepinwall's week-to-week, post-episode reviews of The Sopranos as "a new form" that combined episode recaps with analyses of the show's subtexts and hidden meanings. Sepinwall has said his writing style was partially inspired by newsgroup reviews of Star Trek television episodes written by Timothy W. Lynch, as well as the episode recaps and discussions generated on the website Television Without Pity. Around 2005, in addition to his newspaper columns, Sepinwall began blogging for The Star-Ledger on the website "All TV". Around that time, he also began maintaining his own private blog, "What's Alan Watching", in which he posted reviews and interacted directly with readers.

=== HitFix and Uproxx ===
After 14 years with The Star-Ledger, Sepinwall left the newspaper in 2010 for a job at the entertainment journalism website HitFix, where he would review as many as 15 television shows each week. On that site, he also did a podcast with television critic Dan Fienberg called Firewall & Iceberg.

In 2010, Slate.com writer Josh Levin said Sepinwall "changed the nature of television criticism" and called him the "acknowledged king of the form" with regard to weekly episode recaps and reviews. The A.V. Club writer Steve Heisler called Sepinwall "an inspiration to TV critics throughout the country". Sepinwall made a cameo appearance as an extra in an episode of the NBC comedy Community, a show which he strongly praised. He later wrote that, in hindsight, he regretted appearing on the show due to "the extreme blurring of the line [between reviewer and fan] it caused".

In 2016, Sepinwall began writing for Uproxx. From 2017 to 2018, Sepinwall hosted a podcast called TV Avalanche with fellow Uproxx television critic Brian Grubb.

=== Rolling Stone ===
In May 2018, Sepinwall announced he was leaving Uproxx because he had accepted a job offer from Rolling Stone.

During his appearance in a charity fundraiser on The George Lucas Talk Show, Sepinwall agreed to review The Star Wars Holiday Special, which he had never seen. The review, in which Sepinwall detailed what a complete disaster and bad idea the special was, was later published in Rolling Stone.

On September 15, 2025, Sepinwall was among several high-profile staffers laid off by Rolling Stone.

=== Interviews ===
Sepinwall has interviewed such television figures as The Wire creator David Simon, Mad Men creator Matthew Weiner, The O.C. creator Josh Schwartz, and Breaking Bad creator Vince Gilligan. He also wrote a book about the Fox teen drama series The O.C. called Stop Being a Hater and Learn to Love The O.C., which was published and released in 2004. In 2007, immediately after The Sopranos ended, series creator David Chase gave Sepinwall the sole interview he granted to any journalist at the end of the show. In 2009, when NBC was contemplating canceling the action-comedy Chuck, of which Sepinwall was a strong proponent, he wrote an open letter to NBC executives urging them to renew the show and encouraging them to seek revenue by expanding existing product placement marketing deals. The show was ultimately renewed, and NBC Entertainment co-chairman Ben Silverman partially credited Sepinwall for the show's revival, which reportedly helped increase Sepinwall's prestige. Sepinwall has been a particularly strong advocate for such shows as Lost, The Shield, Breaking Bad, and The Wire.

== Personal life ==
Sepinwall lives in Scotch Plains, New Jersey, with his wife, daughter and son.

== Published works ==
- Sepinwall, Alan (July 27, 2004). Stop Being a Hater and Learn to Love The O.C. Chamberlain Bros. ISBN 1596090065.
- Sepinwall, Alan (November 21, 2012). The Revolution Was Televised. Self published. ISBN 978-0615718293.
- Sepinwall, Alan (May 21, 2013). The Revolution Was Televised. Touchstone Books. ISBN 978-1476739670.
- Sepinwall, Alan & Seitz, Matt Zoller (September 6, 2016). TV (The Book): Two Experts Pick the Greatest American Shows of All Time. Grand Central Publishing. ISBN 978-1455588190.
- Sepinwall, Alan (October 10, 2017). Breaking Bad 101: The Complete Critical Companion. Abrams Books. ISBN 978-1419724831.
- Sepinwall, Alan & Seitz, Matt Zoller (January 8, 2019). The Sopranos Sessions. Abrams Books. ISBN 978-1419734946.
- Sepinwall, Alan (November 28, 2023). Welcome to the O.C.: The Oral History. Mariner Books. ISBN 978-0063342798.
- Sepinwall, Alan (February 4, 2025). Saul Goodman v. Jimmy McGill: The Complete Critical Companion to Better Call Saul. Abrams Books. ISBN 979-8887074252.
- Sepinwall, Alan (October 13, 2026). Serling: A Journey into the Twilight Zone with TV’s First Visionary. Grand Central Publishing. ISBN 978-1538773888.
