= Patrick Corrigan (businessman) =

Australian businessman, art collector and philanthropist

Patrick Corrigan AM
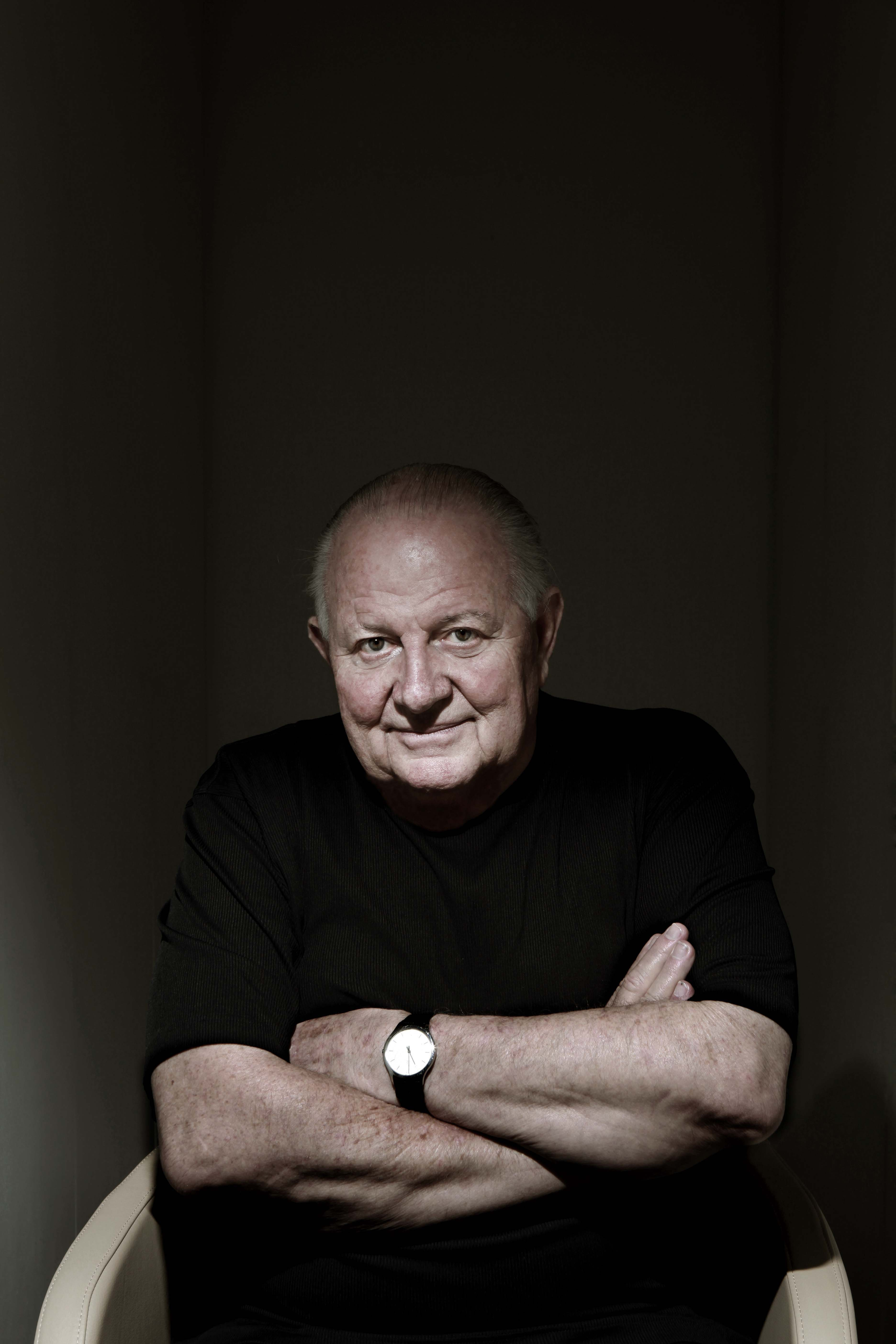
- Born: 9 September 1932 (age 94); Hankou, China
- Citizenship: Australian (since 1960)
- Occupation: Businessman
- Known for: Philanthropy, art collections

Patrick Corrigan, AM (born 9 September 1932), is an Australian businessman, art collector and philanthropist.

== Early life ==
Corrigan was born at Hangkow (now Hankou, part of the city of Wuhan), central China.

Corrigan and his mother were granted a travel permit and left mainland China ahead of his father aboard the SS Fausang, which was captured in the Battle of Hong Kong on 8 December 1941, the same day as the attack on Pearl Harbor. Corrigan and his mother subsequently spent four years in the Stanley Internment Camp during the Japanese occupation of Hong Kong. Corrigan has reflected on his life at this time:

the movie ‘Empire of the Sun' almost duplicates my life in the camp. I was the same age as the boy … and we did things that you see in 'Empire of the Sun' … we used to go under the barbed wire and steal vegetables from the Japanese vegetable garden and come back … it's just amazing, it's like watching yourself when you watch that movie.

After the Japanese surrender in 1945, they were liberated by Australian Navy minesweeper personnel. Corrigan's father had also been interred in a POW camp on mainland China, near Beijing, and was liberated after the surrender.

== Business career ==
Corrigan left school in 1948 at the age of fifteen to work for a Unilever subsidiary where he was employed as a junior clerk in a freight subdivision. In a 2012 interview Corrigan reflected that he's "been stuck with it ever since".

In 1955 Corrigan became general manager of the Sydney customs brokering firm J N Campbell Customs Pty Ltd. He remained with the company until 1967, when he established his own freight forwarding and clearance company, Corrigan's Customs Agency Pty Ltd for a $2 registration fee and a $1,000 bank loan.

In the early years, Corrigan's freight forwarding and clearance companies specialised in shipping fashion, textiles and auxiliary machinery for clients such as Kolotex Pty Ltd, Hilton Pty Ltd and Mark Foys Ltd.

In 1970 it was reported in the press that Corrigan successfully imported the largest ever painting to Australia – American Dream, an 80 x 18 ft work by Brett Whiteley weighing 2.5 tons – for exhibition at Bonython Gallery. In 1970 he also co-founded the firm Express Livestock Pty Ltd, which specialised exclusively in animal cargo.

Corrigan's Express was sold to the British conglomerate Mitchell Cotts & Co Ltd in 1972 and Corrigan remained as chairman until 1983, when he was recruited to establish the local arm of Swiss company, Panalpina, which specialised in forwarding and logistics services. In 1987 Panalpina became the number one IATA accredited agent in NSW.

In 1988, Corrigan founded a new company, Pace Express, and became its executive chairman. In its first year the company achieved the top ranking for export freight forwarding by the IATA, which stemmed from its logistics initiatives in the fresh fruit market. In 1989 the company won the Governor of Victoria Export Awards for significant achievement by a new exporter, and was also named the Exporter of the Year for Transport and Associated Services in the Export Council of Australia's Premier's NSW Export Awards. This was the first time any company had won both major awards in one year and the first time a freight forwarder had won either.

In 1993 Pace Express was acknowledged by the IATA as being the first Australian agent to receive a settlement of more than $2 million for freight forwarding billing in a single month. In 1994 Pace Express was acquired by the American company Air Express International and Corrigan was appointed as director.

In 1998 Corrigan joined VIP Airfreight as chairman, a company that made its mark specialising in handling perishables. In 2000 Corrigan was awarded the Export Council of Australia's prestigious Export Hero award.

Corrigan was chairman and co-owner of Century Freight (2006–2009). Corrigan is chairman of UBI Logistics, which was established in 2009, and holds two public company non-executive directorships: Flagship Investments Ltd and Global Masters Fund Ltd.

=== Other business interests ===
From 1987 to 2002 Corrigan was a director and partner in Woollahra Art Removals, which was acquired by International Art Services. Corrigan is chairman of Corrigan's Art Express, a division of UBI Logistics.

In 2012 he acquired Better Read Than Dead, a large independent bookstore in Sydney's vibrant multi-cultural neighbourhood of Newtown, for which he is co-director.

== Collecting activities ==
=== Books ===
Corrigan began to seriously acquire works of art in the early 1970s and by late that decade Corrigan's collecting was supported by a scholarly Australian art book collection. Corrigan's art book collection was sold to James Hardie Industries in 1979, and he remained a consultant to the collection for the next nine years. It became the core of a donation to the State Library of Queensland in 1988, and is now known as The Australian Art Research Collection, one of four collections that comprise The Australian Library of Art. The Australian Art Research Collection has been described as "Australia's definitive fine arts collection".

=== Lindsay Collection ===
The Lindsay Collection of Pat Corrigan, donated 1992–1997, is one of the largest donations ever made by an individual to an Australian library. The collection includes published and unpublished material relating to the Lindsay family.

=== Australian exhibition catalogues ===
Corrigan has also donated a major collection of Australian art exhibition catalogues, invitations and journals to the Queensland Art Gallery of Modern Art. Known as The Patrick Corrigan Collection of Australian Exhibition Catalogues, the collection comprises over 800 items dated 1889–2008. Approximately 1700 twentieth century Australian art exhibition and gallery catalogues, 1901-2004, with the majority of works published between 1964-2004 are held by the State Library of New South Wales.

=== Bookplates ===
An interest in art and books also led to Corrigan collecting artist bookplates, which he acquired over a twenty-year period between 1975 and 1995, following the acquisition of the collection of John Lane Mullins (1857–1939), an avid enthusiast and supporter who had commissioned the first Australian pictorial bookplate. In the late 1990s he acquired the bookplate collection of the late Harry Muir, founder of Adelaide's Wakefield Press.

Described as "the most comprehensive collection of bookplates by Australian artists ever amassed", The Pat Corrigan Collection of Australian Artists' Bookplates, comprising five thousand plates and related objects, including original artwork, transitional states of the plate and original blocks, was donated to the Art Gallery of New South Wales in 1995, valued at $750,000.

== Philanthropy ==
In addition to major donations of art, books and material heritage collections to public institutions [see Collecting Activities section], Corrigan has donated more than one thousand works of art to over forty-five regional galleries, cultural institutions and charitable organisations across the country.

Corrigan continues to support the State Library of Queensland with donations to The Australian Library of Art, along with major donations of other material. His most notable donation was the collection of letters and manuscripts by the artist Norman Lindsay and his family, which was valued in the late 1990s at well over $1 million.

Corrigan's philanthropy has earned him entry to The Art Life's annual list of the most powerful people in Australian art, "The Power Trip" in 2015, 2016 and 2017.

=== Indigenous ===
Corrigan is the patron of the annual Bond University Indigenous Art Auction, which raises funds to expand the range of Indigenous scholarships available at the university. From its inception in 2010 through 2016, the Indigenous Gala raised over $1.3 million towards Indigenous scholarships and supporting the university's work with the Australian Indigenous Mentoring Experience.

Corrigan also served on the board of the Aboriginal Benefits Foundation, which works to benefit the welfare of Aboriginal communities throughout Australia, in particular with regard to supporting youth, the aged and others who suffer disadvantages.

== Honours and awards ==
Corrigan was awarded the Member of the Order of Australia medal in the 2000 Queen's Birthday Honours List (conferred 12 June 2000) for "service to the visual arts, particularly as a philanthropist to regional galleries and through a grant scheme for artists".

In recognition of his sustained support for and contributions to Bond University and many other Queensland cultural institutions, the Queensland Government conferred the Queensland Greats award on Corrigan in 2014. The award includes a commemorative plaque in Brisbane's Roma Street Parklands.

The Gold Coast city council conferred the city's highest honour on Corrigan in 2015 in recognition of his contribution to the arts.

In recognition of his sustained support for and patronage of the visual arts, and in particular, Aboriginal art, Bond University conferred an honorary doctorate upon Corrigan in 2007.

In 2012 Corrigan was the recipient of the Australian Business Arts Foundation's JB Were Philanthropy Leadership Award, which is bestowed on an individual, family, group or foundation or other entity, which through their leadership, advocacy, practice and example has encouraged increased philanthropic giving to Australia's cultural life.

== Archives At ==
Patrick Corrigan scrapbooks and photograph albums covering his businesses interests, family life and philanthropic support for the arts, 1968-2025, are held by the State Library of New South Wales, MLMSS 12299/Boxes 1X-12X
