= Ghost (blogging platform) =

Free and open-source blogging platforms

- Screenshot Ghost v0.11.9's Admin Control Panel
- Developer: Ghost Foundation
- Release: October 14, 2013
- Stable release: 6.33.0 / 2026-04-24[±]
- Written in: JavaScript
- Operating system: Cross-platform
- Platform: Node.js
- Type: Content management system
- License: MIT
- Website: ghost.org
- Repository: github.com/TryGhost/Ghost

Ghost is an open source content management system platform written in JavaScript and distributed under the MIT License, designed to simplify the process of online publishing for individual bloggers as well as online publications.

The concept of the Ghost platform was first floated publicly in November 2012 in a blog post by project founder John O'Nolan, which generated enough response to justify coding a prototype version with collaborator Hannah Wolfe.

The first public version of Ghost, released October 2013, was financed by a successful Kickstarter campaign which achieved its initial funding goal of £25,000 in 11 hours and went on to raise a final total of £196,362 during the 29-day campaign.

== History ==
The initial concept for the Ghost platform was presented in a November 2012 blog post by project founder John O'Nolan, who was also the former deputy lead of the WordPress user interface team. O'Nolan presented Ghost as an "idealistic and fictional" solution to the increasing difficulty of using WordPress to build blogs, its original purpose, rather than as a more complex content management system. Following considerable demand and positive feedback on the post from the community O'Nolan recruited long-time friend Hannah Wolfe to help him create an initial prototype of the platform.

On April 29, 2013, O'Nolan released a video of the prototype in a crowdfunding campaign on Kickstarter with a goal of £25,000 to fund the completion of initial development work. The project was successfully funded in 11 hours and went on to raise a final total of £196,362 during the 29-day campaign. The project relied on backing both from individuals as well as sponsorship from companies who had an interest in seeing the platform succeed. Notable backers included Seth Godin, Leo Babauta, Darren Rowse, Tucker Max, major companies such as Woo-Themes, Envato, and Microsoft.

On September 19, 2013, the first public version of Ghost was released, named Kerouac as an early release to people who had backed the Kickstarter campaign.

On October 14, 2013, Ghost was made available for the first time as an extended-release to the general public via GitHub as of version 0.3.3 – amended with bugfixes and security updates. Ghost announced plans to support ActivityPub in 2024.

Some notable platform users include IBM, Tinder, Sky News, VEVO, and Zappos.

== Foundation ==
The Ghost project is managed by a nonprofit organization headquartered in Singapore called the Ghost Foundation, which was established following the Kickstarter campaign. As of October 2025, the foundation employs 34 full-time members of staff to work on the Ghost project and the surrounding community infrastructure.

== Business model ==
Ghost is free to download and use. In addition, the Foundation offers a paid platform for users who prefer a managed solution, as an alternative to self-hosting. For a monthly fee, users can build a Ghost website or blog, on a fully managed installation, with weekly updates and access to email support. The hosted platform is owned and operated by the Ghost Foundation, and all revenue generated from the service is used to fund further development of the software, and the project's infrastructure.

== Platform ==
Ghost is coded in Node.js, a server-side JavaScript execution engine, and an Ember.js admin client. Since version 2.0, posts can be written using a WYSIWYG editor; in earlier versions, only Markdown was supported. Ghost CMS (content management system) can be used as either a traditional or headless CMS.

== Security ==
On May 3, 2020, Ghost confirmed that its Ghost(Pro) platform was infected with crypto-mining malware. The virus affected both Ghost(Pro) servers and Ghost.org billing services. No user data was compromised, and user credentials were not stored in plain text.

== See also ==
- List of content management systems
- Weblog software
- Substack, a competing blog host service
