= Protein Wisdom =

Protein Wisdom may refer to:

- Protein Wisdom (blog) – a conservative-libertarian weblog created by Jeff Goldstein
- "Protein Wisdom" – a low-protein diet advocated by the London eccentric Stanley Owen Green
- Protein WISDOM – a software tool for protein design
