= Vaughan Bell =

British clinical psychologist

- Citizenship: United Kingdom
- Education: Cardiff University
- Occupation: Clinical Psychologist

Vaughan Bell is a British clinical psychologist, currently at the South London and Maudsley NHS Foundation Trust specialising in psychological interventions for psychotic outpatients and in training other professionals to deal with such patients. He is a clinical senior lecturer in the Division of Psychiatry at the Faculty of Brain Sciences at University College London and a visiting researcher at the Institute of Psychiatry, Psychology and Neuroscience, King's College London. His research focus includes neuropsychology, social cognition, psychosis and brain damage.

== Education ==
Bell did his PhD at Cardiff University, he chose the cognitive neuropsychiatry of psychosis as his research topic. He completed his clinical training at the Institute of psychiatry at King's College London. He specialised in psychosis and neuropsychology and graduated with a Doctorate in Clinical Psychology.

== Career ==
Bell has been the most regular contributor to the Mind Hacks science blog, starting in 2002. In 2012 he won the Erikson Institute Prize for Excellence in Mental Health Media. In 2014 he and academic Tom Stafford received the British Psychological Society’s Public Engagement and Media Award.

Bell has written articles on psychology and neuroscience for several newspapers and magazines, including The Guardian, Discover, Slate, Wired UK, The Independent and The Atlantic. He was interviewed in 2005 by the influential journal Nature about his experience as a scientist editing Wikipedia, specifically in challenging a section on violence in the schizophrenia article.

A fluent Spanish speaker, for several years he undertook teaching and clinical work at university facilities in Colombia and worked as a mental health coordinator for Médecins sans Frontières in difficult conditions.
