= CTK =

CTK may refer to:

- C. T. K. Chari (1909–1993), Head of the Department of Philosophy at Madras Christian College from 1958 to 1969
- City Thameslink railway station (station code: CTK), a central London railway station within the City of London
- Crash Test Kitchen, a video cooking podcast and video blog
- CTK – CiTylinK, an airline based in Accra, Ghana
- Czech News Agency, (also ČTK), a national public service news agency in the Czech Republic
