= George Deutsch =

NASA press officer

George Carlton Deutsch III was a press officer of the United States space agency NASA. He was appointed to the position by President George W. Bush, having previously worked in the Bush/Cheney 2004 campaign "War Room" and on the 55th Presidential Inaugural Committee.

== Biography ==
Deutsch gained notoriety in late 2005 and early 2006, when it was reported that he had instructed a NASA website designer to add the word "theory" after every occurrence of the phrase Big Bang. In his memo to the website designer, Deutsch wrote that the Big Bang is "not proven fact; it is opinion... It is not NASA's place, nor should it be to make a declaration such as this about the existence of the universe that discounts intelligent design by a creator... This is more than a science issue, it is a religious issue." The memo also noted that the AP Stylebook calls for the usage of the phrase "Big Bang theory".

Prior to the 2004 Bush/Cheney presidential campaign, Deutsch had been a student at Texas A&M University. His NASA résumé falsely asserted that he had a B.A. degree in journalism, but in February 2006 a blogger at The Scientific Activist discovered that he had never graduated. This was subsequently confirmed by Texas A&M, and Deutsch resigned from NASA. Deutsch later returned to Texas A&M and completed his degree that year.

James E. Hansen, the director of NASA's Goddard Institute for Space Studies, and several other career NASA scientists and public affairs officials had been interviewed by The New York Times in January 2006. In these interviews, they complained about "intensifying efforts by political appointees in NASA, including Deutsch, to control more closely" the content of their public statements. Deutsch, speaking to the New York Times, gave his opinion that Hansen had exaggerated the threat of global warming. He denied lying to NASA about his college degree.

== See also ==
- Intelligent design
- Teach the controversy
