= Milblog =

Weblog mostly covering an ongoing war

A milblog or warblog is a blog devoted mostly or wholly to covering news events concerning an ongoing war. Sometimes the use of the term "warblog" implies that the blog concerned has a pro-war slant. The term "milblog" implies that the author is a member of, or has some connection to the military; the more specific term "soldierblog" is sometimes used for the former.

== History ==
The coinage 'warblog' is attributed to Matt Welch, who started his War Blog within days of the September 11 attacks. In the fall of 2001, the attacks gave rise to a "war-blogging movement," which favoured political punditry over the often personal and technological orientation that had dominated the blog genre up to that point, achieving much greater public and media recognition than earlier blogs. Most warblogs supported the US-led War in Afghanistan and the Iraq War from a hawkish perspective.

Milblogging was popularized by Glenn Reynolds, whose Instapundit was one of the most popular political blogs on the web. Some prominent milblogs, such as Little Green Footballs by Charles Johnson and Daily Dish by Andrew Sullivan existed before September 11, but made the war on terror their primary focus afterwards. Other notable milblogs included Dynamist by Virginia Postrel, KausFiles by Mickey Kaus, Talking Points Memo by Josh Marshall, KenLayne.com by Ken Layne, and Lileks.com by James Lileks.

=== Iraq War (2003–2011) ===
Military blogs emerged with the U.S. invasion of Iraq in 2003. Initially named "warblogs" as well, they became popular under the name "milblogging" in 2004. In October 2005, a U.S. soldier named Jean-Paul Borda launched the blog aggregator Milblogging.com. A milblog is primarily focused on the events of the military, written about by those with inside knowledge of the military, whether an active soldier, a veteran of the military, a spouse of a soldier, or a civilian with a special connection to the military.

The pseudonymous Salam Pax, an Iraqi national who was posting first-hand accounts from Baghdad, emerged as a prominent war blogger. Media organisations that started their own reporters' milblog at this point included the BBC, the Christian Science Monitor, and the Seattle Post-Intelligencer. In the first half of 2003, CNN, The Hartford Courant, and Time were among the media organizations that prohibited staff reporters from covering US-led wars first-hand in their personal blogs for fear both of legal repercussions and of competition from such blogs.

Most blogs that gained popularity as "warblogs" expanded their focus to politics and general news, usually from a right-of-center perspective, yet continued to be commonly known as warblogs. While milblogs arose in response to the post-September-11 wars and mostly limited their commentary to them, some moved on to related political, social and cultural issues and continued after the end of the wars.

C.J. Grisham was among the first active duty soldiers to become a milblogger when he opened A Soldier's Perspective in December 2004. Within five years, ASP was receiving an average of 1,500 visitors per day (nearly 1 million in total) from over 120 countries and was ranked the second most popular site on Milblogging.com.

In 2005, there were fewer than 200 "milblogs" in existence. In July 2011, Milblogging.com listed more than 3,000 military blogs in 46 countries. The top 5 locations were US, Iraq, Afghanistan, the United Kingdom, and Germany.

=== Russo-Ukrainian war (2022-present) ===
During the Russo-Ukrainian war, Russian milblogs became increasingly popular.

== Social impact and government response ==
=== Iraq War ===
Iraq War milblogs have been highlighted in scholarship as an important source of public diplomacy and perception management during the early 2000s. Whereas Secretary of Defense Donald Rumsfeld was at first believed to be skeptical of military blogs, by 2007 president George W. Bush lauded them as "an important voice for the cause of freedom." Milblogs often criticized the media coverage of the wars in Afghanistan and Iraq, seeking to correct what they saw as biased or negative reporting. Thus, Matt Burden of Blackfive.net cites as the rationale of his blog the death in combat of a fellow soldier and good friend of his, who died saving the life of a magazine reporter, yet had his death go unreported by the magazine. One milblogger chose to offer his site "as an educational service to the American People who wish to know the true story of Iraq and Afghanistan." Other milblogs cite similar intentions to report the news that they did not feel the mainstream media was reporting.

In contrast, anti-war blogs have been noted in retrospect as a major source of opposition to the Iraq War and criticism of pro-war messaging in news media. The Army did not universally censor antiwar messaging on milblogs, but such blogs were eventually brought to their attention. In 2004, Colby Buzzell was confined to base in Iraq after his milblog My War was quoted by The News Tribune to describe a difficult firefight in Mosul which had not been covered in depth by national news media. Buzzell was deeply opposed to the occupation of Iraq, but My War was not shut down entirely; instead, Buzzell was made to submit all posts for review by his chain of command.

Official oversight of websites maintained by military personnel deployed to the Middle East began in 2002. The oversight mission consisted of active-duty soldiers and contractors, as well as Guard and Reserve members from Maryland, Texas and Washington state. Its remit was expanded in August 2005. The Army Web Risk Assessment Cell was created to monitor compliance with military regulations. In April 2005, a four-page document of regulations was issued by Multi-National Corps-Iraq, directing all military bloggers in Iraq to register with their units, and commanders to conduct quarterly reviews to make sure bloggers were not disclosing casualty numbers or violating operational security or privacy rules. Some milbloggers took down or altered their blogs for fear of violating the regulation that many of them believed to be ambiguous. The regulations were updated in April 2007 but, according to many bloggers in war theatres, failed to resolve their ambiguities.

Although the U.S. Department of Defense was initially concerned about milblogs as a potential OPSEC violation, it eventually embraced the concept and attempted to implement official versions of milblogs. Official milblogs did not receive the same reception or popularity of the unofficial milblogs as they were written in the same dull language as other official publications of the Defense Department.

=== Russo-Ukrainian war (2022-present) ===
In Russia, military bloggers (also called "war bloggers", "milbloggers" or voenkory, "war correspondents") have gained prominence during the 2022 Russian invasion of Ukraine, providing a greater level of information about the war than is available from state media. Blogs range from those affiliated with state media, which often provided information more in-line with that of government positions, to independent and Wagner Group-affiliated blogs which are more critical of the Russian military establishment's performance in Ukraine. These blogs are notable for their ultranationalist and pro-war views but can be critical of the Russian government's prosecution of the war. In 2023, many of these bloggers were active on the messaging app Telegram; however, as of 2026 Telegram has been banned in Russia in what has been seen as an attempt to curtail criticism of the war.

The Institute for the Study of War attributed their popularity to the Russian government's failure to establish an effective social media presence as well as its failure in preparing the Russian public for a drawn-out war. The Russian government has protected them from calls for censorship and has selectively granted positions to nationalist and pro-war milbloggers due to their importance in the ultranationalist constituency which Vladimir Putin's presidency has become increasingly reliant upon. Putin himself has met with prominent milbloggers aligned with state-media to discuss military matters. However, since September 2023, the Russian government arrested a number of high-profile milbloggers, which some have seen as a crackdown on the community.

== Famous milbloggers ==
=== Russian ===
- Igor Girkin (Strelkov) #
- Vladlen Tatarsky †
- Mikhail Zvinchuk (Rybar)
- Semyon Pegov (WarGonzo)
- Evgeniy Poddubny
- Alexander Kots
- Andrey Morozov (Murz) †
- Alexander Sladkov

=== Ukrainian ===
- Oleksiy Arestovych
- Dmitry Gordon
- Anatoly Shariy
- Anton Gerashchenko
- Michail Onufrienko

=== Other ===
- Larry C. Johnson

== See also ==
- Open-source intelligence
- List of blogging terms
