= ZooBorns =

ZooBorns logo

ZooBorns is a zoology news blog and book line that announces animal births at AZA, EAZA, CAZA, ZAA, and WAZA accredited zoos and aquariums. ZooBorns was founded in 2008 with the mission to "educate while it entertains", and typically shares related conservation information along with pictures and video of baby animals.

ZooBorns has been featured in The Washington Post, NBC News, Discover Magazine, and on the Martha Stewart Show among other media outlets. The site was created by Andrew Bleiman, co-founder of Zooillogix who lives in Chicago, and Chris Eastland, an artist living in Brooklyn.

== Content ==
ZooBorns showcases baby animals as ambassadors for their species in order to build empathy and awareness for the plight of those species in the wild. Content is written to be accessible to a wide audience and typically provides background on individual animals followed by conservation information about the species. The site is notable for providing easily navigable categories enabling it to serve as a non-exhaustive survey of recent juvenile animals at zoos and aquariums. As of May 2012, the site had documented over 1,250 births, comprising over 200 species from over 200 different zoological institutions.

== Books ==
In 2010 ZooBorns released two books published by Simon & Schuster: ZooBorns, written for adults and young adults and ZooBorns! Zoo Babies from Around the World, for young children, age 3-6. Both featured animal babies born at accredited zoos and aquariums around the world. ZooBorns was recognized as a 2012: American Library Association's Quick Pick for Reluctant Young Readers and ZooBorns! Zoo Babies from Around the World was a 2011–2012: Keystone to Reading Book Award Nominee.

In 2011 ZooBorns released ZooBorns Cats!, which showcased kitten and cub photos of 30 species of the 36 known feline species, including rare photos of the critically endangered Iriomote cat and vulnerable kodkod, also known as the guiña.

In 2012 ZooBorns is slated to release follow-ups to their first two books, ZooBorns The Next Generation, for all ages and ABC ZooBorns, for young children. Two Ready-to-Read books for toddlers will also be released, Welcome to the World, ZooBorns! and I Love You, ZooBorns!
