= Supper Mario Broth =

Mario blog and social media accounts

- Logo for Supper Mario Broth, featuring the carrot power-up from the 1992 platform game Super Mario Land 2: 6 Golden Coins
- Website type: Blog, social media accounts
- Owner: Broth
- Creator: Broth
- Website: www.suppermariobroth.com
- Launched: Blog: 2012; 14 years ago X: April 2016; 10 years ago

X information
- Handle: @MarioBrothBlog
- Display name: Supper Mario Broth
- Years active: 2016–present
- Followers: 267.7K
- Last updated: March 23, 2026

Supper Mario Broth is a blog and series of social media accounts known for posting obscure and humorous content related to the Mario franchise. Since the blog's creation in 2012, it has shared thousands of facts and pieces of media from the series, often in the form of educational entertainment.

== Creation ==
The Supper Mario Broth blog, described as a "Super Mario variety blog", was launched in 2012 by two authors, both of whom have maintained anonymity. The blog's name originated from a brainstorming session in which the authors agreed to choose a food-related name due to this being a regular theme of the Mario series, hence the words Supper and Broth. One of the authors focused on posting factual content, while the other focused on posting humorous material. Following a hiatus, the latter author left the blog in 2016, after which many of the humor-related posts were removed from the site, though some were subsequently reinstated with disclaimers following backlash from fans.

== Activity ==
Since 2016, the Supper Mario Broth blog and social media accounts have been owned and run by one individual, a German man in his 30s who prefers to be known as simply "Broth". Content regularly shared on Supper Mario Broth includes sprites, models, glitches, advertisements, merchandise, screenshots, GIFs, and artwork. The most viewed post on the Supper Mario Broth blog is a GIF from the 2003 sports video game Mario Golf: Toadstool Tour. Supper Mario Broth has also amassed large followings on both Tumblr and X.

Supper Mario Broth has followed a strict "veracity policy" since 2017, and posts deemed to be in violation of said policy have been removed. Despite some of Supper Mario Broth's content being perceived as ironic humor, the blog's author has stated: "I'm not a humorous person. I'm the sort of person who likes facts. If you have looked at my blog for even a second, you might have noticed that the content post is very outlandish, but it is all factual. And I realized that outlandish factual content looks a lot like joke content."

The author of Supper Mario Broth has experienced financial difficulties, despite having a job working with elderly individuals with mental disorders such as Alzheimer's disease. An interview with Vice revealed that the author had sold all of his video games along with their corresponding video game consoles. The author has relied on a Patreon to continue running Supper Mario Broth, as well as work on a comic inspired by the 2004 role-playing video game Paper Mario: The Thousand-Year Door. As of September 2018, the Patreon was being backed by 222 people.

On October 17, 2024, the author of Supper Mario Broth announced that due to the death of his mother, of whom he had been the primary caretaker for the past six years, he would have to discontinue working on Supper Mario Broth. After the author posted a now-private YouTube video in which he asked for financial help, the number of Patreon supporters for Supper Mario Broth increased from a few hundred to more than 4,000. On October 18, the author announced via a tweet that he would be able to run Supper Mario Broth full time, as well as "invest into material and equipment for more and better Mario content".

On November 8, 2026, the author of Supper Mario Broth announced on social media that he had been diagnosed with a genetic disease, with complications including heart failure and retinopathy. He specified that he had been given a two-in-three chance to survive another year, and that he would continue running the account as long as he is physically able.

== Reception ==
Writing for Vice, Patrick Klepek described the tone of Supper Mario Broth as "equal parts fascinating and bewildering", adding that "[t]he blog's steadfast dedication to pinpoint accuracy often comes across as part of a larger, tongue-in-cheek performance built around a potentially unhealthy obsession with Mario factoids". Frank Cifaldi, a video game historian and the founder of the nonprofit, archival-focused Video Game History Foundation, stated: "You'd think everyone has said all there is to say about Super Mario Bros. by now. Broth proves that if you dig deep into ephemera and data-mine the games themselves, you can find all kinds of new and interesting talking points."

Writing for The Verge, Ash Parrish lauded the Supper Mario Broth blog as both "one of the most wholesome Mario blogs on the internet" and "a celebrated institution in the broader Nintendo community". In a subsequent article for Kotaku, Parrish gave Supper Mario Broth further praise for being "the internet's number one guy for obscure Mario facts" as well as "possibly the only person in the world who loves and knows Mario as much as Shigeru Miyamoto". In his own blog on the video game website Aftermath, Luke Plunkett referred to the Supper Mario Broth X account as "quite frankly exceptional" and praised its official response to negative feedback.

Supper Mario Broth has been variously described as a "Super Mario lore specialist" by Scott McCrae of GamesRadar+, "one of Tumblr's best and weirdest blogs" by Allegra Frank of Polygon, and "the best Super Mario archivist on planet Earth" by Mike Drucker of TheGamer. Moreover, Jack Yarwood of Time Extension summarized Supper Mario Broth as "the prime destination for weird and wonderful facts about the Mario series", with Gizmodo's Matthew Gault offering additional praise for being "a constant delight on an increasingly grotesque and horrifying internet" as well as "a pleasant distraction". In an article for TheGamer, Sam Woods lauded Supper Mario Broth as "a social media legend" and "one of the most wholesome, informative, and interesting accounts on social media".

== See also ==
- List of blogs
- Video game culture
- Internet culture
