= Andrey Morozov =

Russian military blogger (1979–2024)

Andrei Morozov
- Андрей Морозов
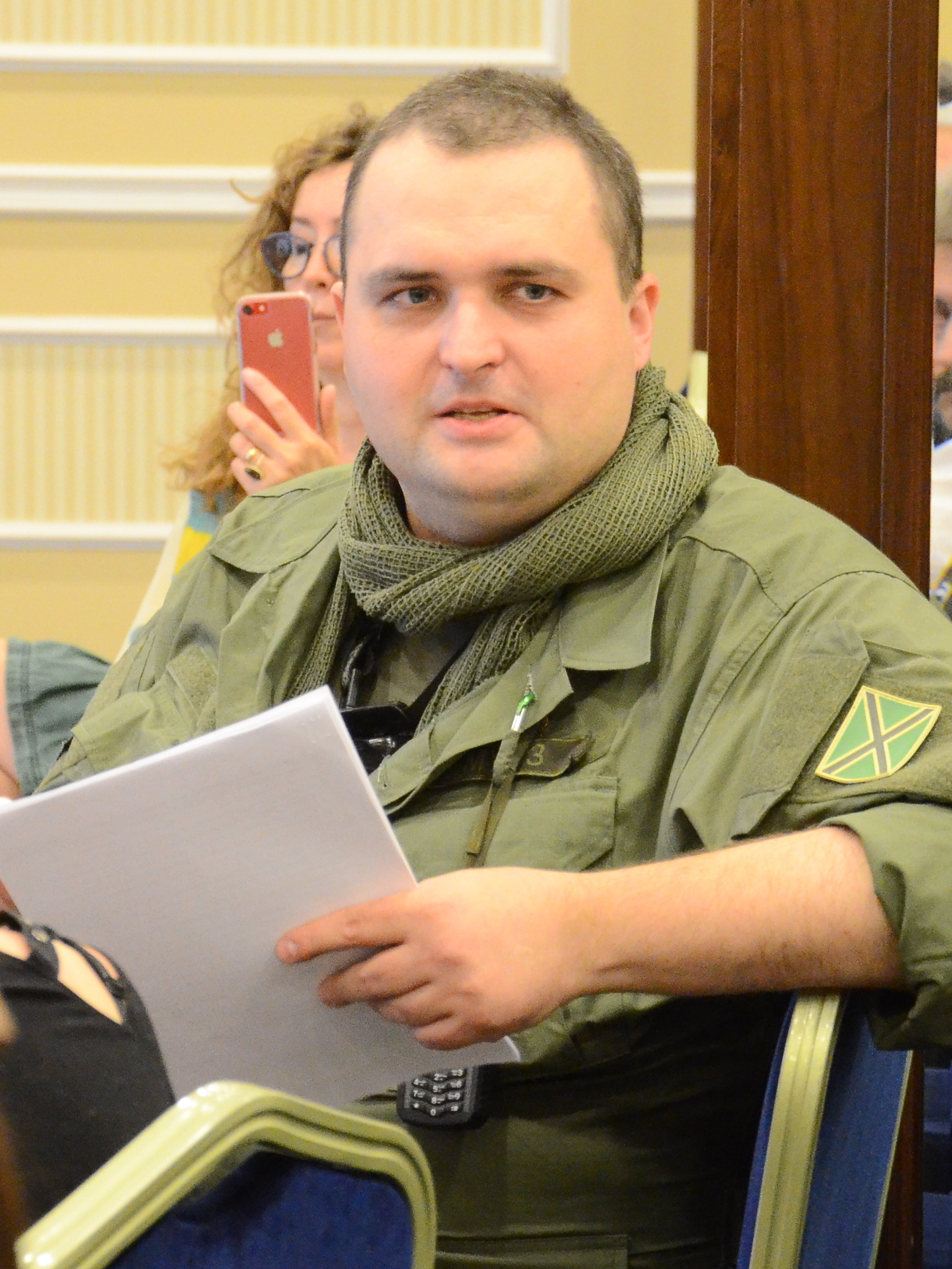
- Morozov in 2020
- Born: 17 August 1979; Moscow, Russian SFSR, Soviet Union
- Died: 21 February 2024 (aged 44)
- Cause of death: Suicide by gunshot
- Other name: Murz
- Occupation: Milblogger

Andrey Sergeyevich Morozov (Russian: Андрей Сергеевич Морозов; 17 August 1979 – 21 February 2024), known by the pseudonym Murz, was a Russian military blogger and a war correspondent.

== Career ==
Andrey Morozov was born on 17 August 1979, in Moscow. Morozov had been taking part in the Donbas War since 2014. He ran a Telegram channel, to which more than 100,000 people subscribed. He was known for his criticism of the military leadership.

Morozov was the former leader of Red Blitzkrieg, a Russian Stalinist group. He fired four shots from a sawn-off shotgun towards the United Russia office on Kutuzovsky Prospekt in Moscow in March 2007. Morozov took part in the attack on the Polish Embassy in Moscow. In 2008, found guilty of hooliganism, illegal possession of weapons, and calls for extremism, he was sentenced to three years in prison. He was sentenced on 26 June 2008 and released on parole on 14 July 2009.

He took part in the Battle of Debaltseve.

From February 2022, Morozov was involved in the Russian invasion of Ukraine. Morozov was a member of the "Coordination Center for Assistance to Novorossiya" from November 2015. He was a serviceman of the 4th Motorized Rifle Brigade of the Russian Army. He was also a guard sergeant in the 14th LPR Prizrak Armored Troops. Around September to December 2023, he was a guest of the "Intelligence Questioning" project of Dmitry Puchkov.

== Death ==
On 18 February 2024, Morozov published a post in his telegram channel about 16,000 Russian casualties during the Battle of Avdiivka, which he attributed to Russian command incompetence and "human wave" tactics. Two days later, on 20 February 2024, he deleted the post, claiming to have been forced into doing so by campaign of hate unrolled by Vladimir Solovyov and "Z-bloggers" who described him as traitor for revealing the real losses. The next day, on 21 February 2024, he posted a suicide note, blaming Solovyov, and killed himself with a firearm.

== See also ==
- Suspicious Russia-related deaths since 2022
