= Georgetown Municipal Airport =

Georgetown Executive Airport
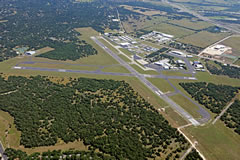
- IATA: QTG; ICAO: KGTU; FAA LID: GTU

Summary
- Airport type: Public
- Owner: City of Georgetown
- Serves: Georgetown, Texas
- Elevation AMSL: 790 ft (240 m)
- Coordinates: 30°40′43.71″N 097°40′45.78″W

Map
- Location within Texas Location within the United States

Runways
Direction	Length		Surface
Direction	ft	m	Surface
11/29	4,100	1,250	Asphalt
18/36	5,000	1,524	Asphalt

Statistics (2021)
- Aircraft operations: 120,900
- Based aircraft: 320
- Source: Federal Aviation Administration

Georgetown Executive Airport is in Williamson County, Texas, three miles north of Georgetown. The FAA's National Plan of Integrated Airport Systems for 2023–2027 categorized it as a reliever airport.

Most U.S. airports use the same three-letter location identifier for the FAA and IATA, but this airport is GTU to the FAA and has the IATA code QTG.

== Facilities ==
The airport covers 640 acres (260 ha) at an elevation of 790 feet (241 m). It has two asphalt runways: 11/29 is 4,100 by 75 feet (1,250 x 23 m) and 18/36 is 5,000 by 100 feet (1,524 x 30 m).

In the year ending December 31st, 2021, the airport had 120,900 aircraft operations, average 350 per day: 99% general aviation, 1% air taxi and 1% military. 320 aircraft were then based at the airport: 77% single-engine, 9% multi-engine, 8% jet, 6% helicopters.

== Incidents ==
On February 18, 2010 Andrew Joseph Stack flew a Piper Cherokee from Georgetown Municipal Airport into the Internal Revenue Service building in Austin, Texas. This suicide attack killed one IRS employee and Stack himself.

== See also ==
- List of airports in Texas
