= Durma Melhor =

Brazilian sleep science blog

- Website type: Repository for news, interviews and research on sleep.
- Available in: Portuguese
- Creator: Marcos Miguel
- Website: Durma Melhor.com
- Launched: January, 2010.
- Current status: Active

Durma Melhor ("Sleep Better", translated into English) is a Brazilian blog featuring relevant information on issues related to sleep. Published in Portuguese, the blog content includes articles on nutrition, beauty, exercise, relaxation, environment, technology, scientific studies and frequently asked questions regarding sleep.

It also features a selection of videos, podcasts, books, websites, soothing songs available for free download, as well as online tests to assess one's sleep quality and a comprehensive list of sleep labs in Brazil.

Durma Melhor contributors include Dr. Flávio Alóe, neurologist and neurophysiologist of the Brazilian Society of Clinical Neurophysiology and a certified physician in Sleep Medicine by the Brazilian Society of Sleep, who's been widely interviewed by Brazilian magazines, newspapers and TV shows, such as Programa do Jô.

In April 2010, Durma Melhor launched a channel that allows the general public to send questions and have them answered by experts in sleep medicine.

The blog was launched in January 2010 by Marcos Miguel, a Brazilian journalist who's graduated at the Universidade Federal de Juiz de Fora, in Minas Gerais state.

== See also ==
- Snoring
- Sleep apnea
- Insomnia
- List of blogs
- Narcolepsy
- Sleepwalking
