= The Underwear Expert =

Men's underwear website

- Website type: E-Commerce
- Available in: English
- Owner: Michael Kleinmann
- Editor: Michael Kleinmann
- Website: www.underwearexpert.com
- Launched: 2011

The Underwear Expert is a website that started as a men's underwear blog and transitioned to a subscription based online retailer offering a curated underwear subscription with over 50 brands, featuring underwear styles, advice and reviews, fabric glossary, men's underwear trend analysis and style and service-oriented content. According to The New York Times, The Underwear Expert is a "comprehensive website dedicated to researching, testing, reviewing and even curating for sale underpants."

Michael Kleinmann is CEO of the company. Kleinmann was president and COO of Freshpair from 2001 to 2011, before launching The Underwear Expert. Kleinmann has also written men's underwear articles for The Huffington Post.

While comfort and fit are important when underwear shopping, Kleinmann claims that men's underwear has become a fashion item, with nearly 600 brands producing them. He compares the underwear movement to sneakers, another outlet for expression, with many fabric, style and color choices becoming available on the market.
