= Airline Reporter =

Airline industry news blog

- Screenshot Screenshot of AirlineReporter.com's Homepage
- Website type: Online Journalism
- Available in: English
- Owner: AirlineReporter.com
- Editor: David Parker Brown
- Website: airlinereporter.com
- Commercial: No
- Registration: Optional
- Launched: July 2008; 18 years ago
- Current status: Active

Airline Reporter is an airline industry news blog that provides industry-wide news to readers who are interested in the airline and travel industry itself. Owned and operated by David Parker Brown, with writers located around the world and syndication with Reuters, it has been referenced by CNN, CNBC, NPR, Marker Place, FOX, AOL, Huffington Post, Forbes, APEX magazine, USA Today, KING5, MSNBC (now NBC News), Puget Sound Business Journal, Savvy Stews Network, Seattle Times, Gadling, Contemporary Business, The Independent and the Business Insider, and many other US and international media. Since its inception in 2008, it reports news and events affecting the industry, taking advantage of new media to facilitate dialogue and interaction between airlines, aerospace companies, industry experts, and travelers.

On July 17, 2012, Weird or What? featured David Parker Brown as an airline expert, during a documentary of American Airlines Flight 191 in the episode Premonitions.
