= Marmot Mountain (British Columbia) =

Mountain in British Columbia, Canada

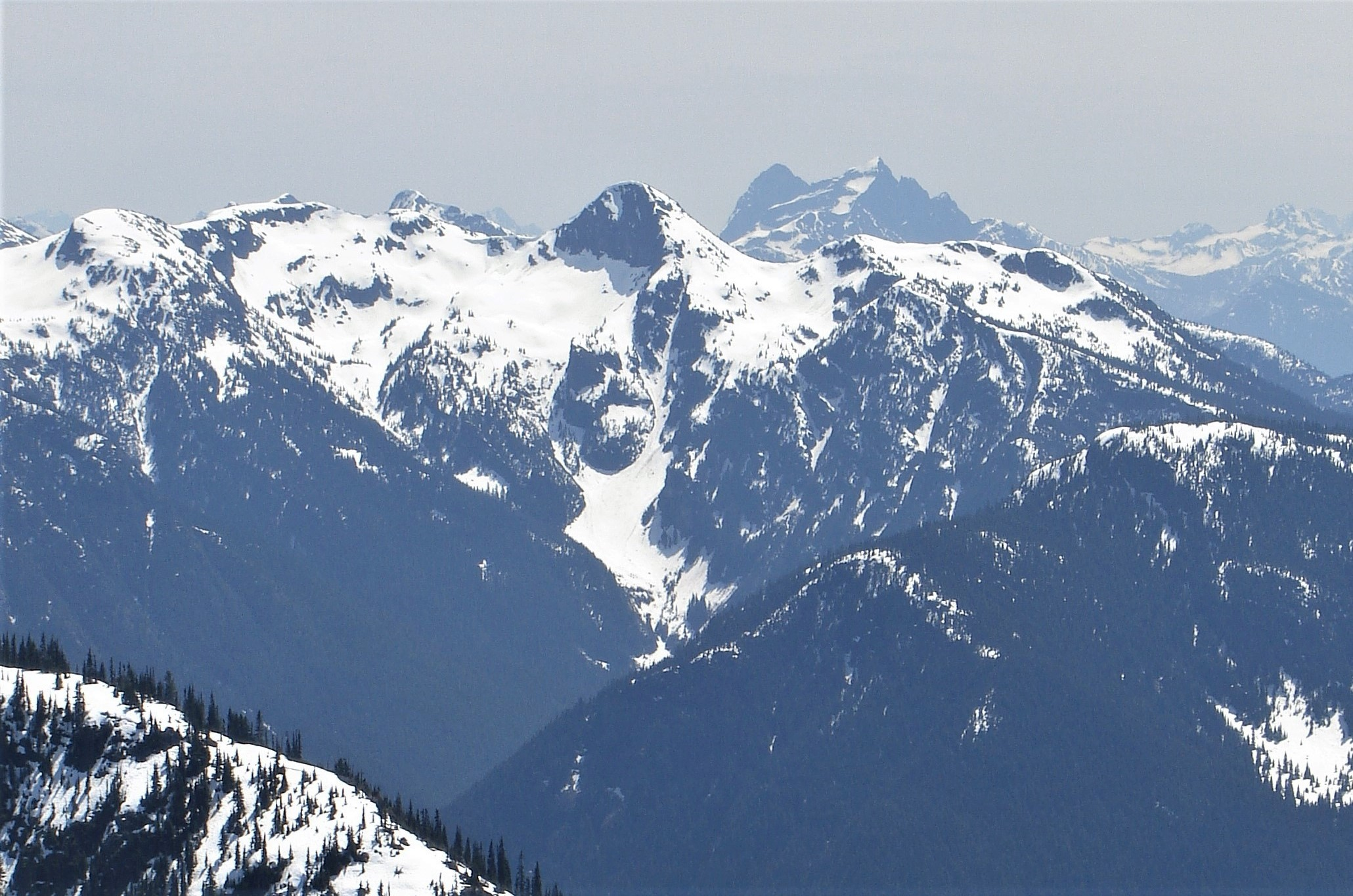
- Northwest aspect

Highest point
- Elevation: 2,103 m (6,900 ft)
- Prominence: 783 m (2,569 ft)
- Parent peak: Silvertip Mountain (2,596 m)
- Isolation: 4.46 km (2.77 mi)
- Listing: Mountains of British Columbia
- Coordinates: 49°11′38″N 121°07′31″W

Geography
- Location within British Columbia Location within Canada
- Interactive map of Marmot Mountain
- Country: Canada
- Province: British Columbia
- District: Yale Division Yale Land District
- Protected area: Skagit Valley Provincial Park
- Parent range: Skagit Range; Canadian Cascades
- Topo map: NTS 92H3 Skagit River

Marmot Mountain is a 2,103-metre (6,900-foot) mountain summit located in the Canadian Cascades of British Columbia, Canada.

== Description ==
Marmot Mountain is part of the Skagit Range which is a subrange of the North Cascades. It is situated 31 km (19 mi) southeast of Hope on the northern boundary of Skagit Valley Provincial Park. Precipitation runoff from the peak's north slope drains to the Sumallo River via Laforgue Creek, whereas the south and east slopes drain into the Skagit River. Topographic relief is significant as the summit rises 1,493 metres (4,900 feet) above the Skagit River in 2.5 kilometres (1.55 mile). The mountain's toponym was shown on a 1912 Geological Survey of Canada map and officially adopted on October 6, 1936, by the Geographical Names Board of Canada.

== Climate ==
Most weather fronts originate in the Pacific Ocean, and travel east toward the Cascade Mountains. As fronts approach the North Cascades, they are forced upward by the peaks (orographic lift), causing them to drop their moisture in the form of rain or snowfall. As a result, the Cascade Mountains experience high precipitation, especially during the winter months in the form of snowfall. Winter temperatures can drop below −10 °C with wind chill factors below −20 °C. During winter months, weather is usually cloudy, but due to high pressure systems over the Pacific Ocean that intensify during summer months, there is often little or no cloud cover during the summer. The months of July through September offer the most favorable weather for viewing and climbing Marmot Mountain.

== Geology ==
The North Cascades feature some of the most rugged topography in the Cascade Range with craggy peaks, ridges, and deep glacial valleys. Geological events occurring many years ago created the diverse topography and drastic elevation changes over the Cascade Range leading to the various climate differences. These climate differences lead to vegetation variety defining the ecoregions in this area.

The history of the formation of the Cascade Mountains dates back millions of years ago to the late Eocene Epoch. With the North American Plate overriding the Pacific Plate, episodes of volcanic igneous activity persisted. In addition, small fragments of the oceanic and continental lithosphere called terranes created the North Cascades about 50 million years ago.

During the Pleistocene period dating back over two million years ago, glaciation advancing and retreating repeatedly scoured the landscape leaving deposits of rock debris. The U-shaped cross sections of the river valleys are a result of recent glaciation. Uplift and faulting in combination with glaciation have been the dominant processes which have created the tall peaks and deep valleys of the North Cascades area.

== See also ==
- Geography of British Columbia
- Geography of the North Cascades
