= Milblogging.com =

Web portal for military blogs (founded 2005)

Milblogging.com was a web portal that indexed military blogs worldwide. As of November 2007, Milblogging indexed over 1,800 military blogs in over 30 countries including those written by troops deployed to the frontlines of Iraq and Afghanistan. As of early 2016, the website had become no longer reachable.

== History ==
Milblogging was founded by Jean-Paul Borda in 2005. Prior to Milblogging, Borda ran a military blog from Afghanistan while deployed with the Army National Guard during Operation Enduring Freedom. His original military blog "The National Guard Experience" was written as a means to stay in touch with family, friends and supporters while on deployment. Frustrated by a lack of media coverage on the positive accomplishments of the U.S. military in Iraq and Afghanistan and wanting an easy way to find military blogs, Borda decided during his deployment to create an aggregator site of military-related blogs from around the world when he returned to the United States.

The website was launched in October 2005 and quickly garnered attention from media and blogs. By the end of December 2005, the website had been featured in several major media publications, including the Army Times, Newsweek, and the Washington Post. In September 2007, U.S. President George W. Bush met with military bloggers, including two from milblogging.com.

Milblogging was acquired in January 2006 by Military.com, which is owned by Monster.com.
