= Skatter Tech =

Digital publication

- Website type: Weblog
- Available in: English
- Creator: Sahas Katta
- Website: www.skattertech.com
- Registration: Optional
- Launched: October, 2005
- Current status: Online

Skatter Tech is a digital publication with daily coverage of technology news and reviews. Content includes everything from smart phones, tablets, computers, games, accessories, apps, web services, and more. About 10000 articles have been published since the launch in 2005 as of 2011. The blog is run by the admin and founder, Sahas Katta.

== Founding ==
Prior to the launch of Skatter Tech in October 2005, much of the content was a part of Sahas Katta's personal blog, SahasKatta.com. Within a few months of launch, it received a warm web reception. Skatter Tech was accessed by over 1.5 million readers within 12 months of launch. Few of the earlier popular topics on the blog included hacks for the Sony PlayStation Portable, Soda Machines, and Master Locks.

== Blog ==
Content published on Skatter Tech is also redistributed through Reuters, Google News, Computer Shopper, and local news papers. Popular content includes customizations for popular operating systems and mobile phones in the United States. Skatter Tech covers many exhibitions and press events every year including the Consumer Electronics Show, MacWorld Expo, Nvision, E3, Comic-Con, and CTIA.

== Writers ==
As of November 2009, there are total of 15 writers.

Name	Position
Sahas Katta	Founder & CEO

== Appearances ==
Skatter Tech has been featured on many major publications over the years.

- BoingBoing
- Yahoo! Tech
- The Blog Herald
- TheNextWeb
- PC World
- Lifehacker
- Engadget
- Gizmodo
- Make Magazine
- CNN Fortune BrainstormTech
