= Metro Jacksonville =

- Screenshot as of November 12, 2012
- Website type: News website, blog, and forum
- Area served: Jacksonville, Florida, United States
- Website: www.metrojacksonville.com
- Commercial: Yes
- Launched: March 13, 2006; 20 years ago
- Current status: Defunct

Metro Jacksonville was an American news website, blog, and forum focusing on Jacksonville, Florida, United States. The site offered news, blogs, forums and original content covering urban issues, politics, and culture in the city.

== History ==
Metro Jacksonville was founded by Steve Congro, Dan Herbin, Ennis Davis, Kevin Connor, and Stephen Dare. The site launched on March 13, 2006 as a blog with the intention to educate the public on issues that matter to cities. The site provided members a platform for discussion on topics concerning urban core, transit-oriented development, municipal policy, and politics in Jacksonville and the Northeast Florida region.

== Awards ==
First Coast American Planning Association gave Metro Jacksonville its Excellence in Media Award in 2008. The Florida Chapter of the American Planning Association recognized the publication with its 2009 Outstanding Public Interest Group Award. In 2010, local alternative weekly Folio Weekly named Metro Jacksonville "Best Political Blog".
