= Ask a Manager =

Workplace advice blog

Ask a Manager is an advice blog on workplace and employment issues written by Alison Green since 2007.

== Background ==
Green founded the blog when she was chief of staff in a nonprofit organisation, and has since transitioned to consulting on workplace issues. She has also written several books in this topic area, including advice for managers, employees, and job-seekers.

== Content ==
The blog mostly comprises Green's responses to readers' questions; Green has said she receives about 50 letters each weekday. Letter-writers seek advice on work-related situations they are facing, covering a range of topics such as job-searching; management skills and ethics; career development; discrimination and mistreatment; labour unions; workers' rights; workplace practices and norms; and interpersonal issues and behaviour at work. The blog also includes many standalone advice posts by Green, such as on résumés, cover letters, and job interviews.

== Reception ==
Ask a Manager has been covered and cited, and Green has been quoted and interviewed, on workplace and employment issues by various media outlets, such as the New York Times, Vogue, Salon.com, Cosmopolitan, The Guardian, The Verge, Quartz, CBS News, BBC, the Los Angeles Times, Slate (in the Dear Prudence advice column), Time, Reader's Digest, Katie Couric Media, CNBC, NPR, Bloomberg, and others. Vulture has described Green as "the internet's preeminent workplace advice columnist."

The blog is viewed two million times each month.

Green has also written the Direct Report column in Slate since 2018, the Ask a Boss column in The Cut since 2016, and an unnamed column in Inc. since 2015.
