= Bestiario del balón =

Bestiario del balón (transl. Ball fable collection) is a Colombian collective football weblog.

== History and profile ==
Bestiario del balón started in September 2005. It was inspired on Argentine blog En una baldosa.

This blog consists in a recompilation of old and new material about Colombian "bad" footballers and related issues. It also features old press and television reports about Colombian football.

As of June 2014 Nicolas Samper is the editor of the blog.
