= The Art Life =

The Art Life is a blog about the art scene in Sydney, Australia and was series of television programs broadcast on ABC TV.

== The Art Life Blog ==
Established in 2004 using the Blogger online service, The Art Life established itself as an independent voice of art criticism in the Australian art and media world.

Presented as an anonymous blog, The Art Life features comedic articles, polls and reader discussion to introduce readers to the Sydney art scene.

The identities of The Art Life writers and editors has been the subject of speculation. In October 2004, The Sydney Morning Herald journalist Andrew Hornery reported that arts-writer Andrew Frost and artist Simon Barney were widely believed to be responsible. Although both denied authorship of the blog, the subsequent appearance of Frost on television as the "face" of the blog seemed to put an end to that speculation.

More recently, some contributors to the blog have been named on posts and have included Bonny Dot Cassidy, Carrie Miller, Marcus Trimble, Margaret Mayhew, Ian Houston and Isobel Johnston.

== The Art Life on TV ==
The Art Life was a three-part TV series that aired on the Australian Broadcasting Corporation [ABC] in July 2007. The series was an overview of recent Australian art and was organised thematically: Ep 1 Out There looked at the context of Australian art inspired by the experience of the suburbs, Ep 2 Millions of Images surveyed the practice of photography and video art in the aftermath of Post Modernism while Ep 3 Always Busy Dying was an examination of painting in contemporary art. The series was produced by Frank Haines and directed by Brendan Fletcher. The series was written and presented by Andrew Frost.

Following the initial Art Life series, the ABC commissioned a two subsequent specials.

A Year in The Art Life was broadcast on 13 November 2007 on the ABC and looked at art news from the year December 2006 through to November 2007. The special was presented by Frost and directed by Brendan Fletcher.

The Art Life at the Biennale of Sydney 2008, broadcast on ABC1 on 22 July 2008, was a 27-minute documentary about the bi-annual international art exhibition. The program featured interviews with international artists exhibiting in the Biennale of Sydney including among others Pierre Huyghe, George Bures Miller, Dora Garcia and the curator of the 2008 exhibition Carolyn Christov-Bakargiev. Written and presented by Frost, the documentary was directed by Simon von Wolkenstein.

In March 2009, ABC1 [formerly the ABC] aired The Art Life 2. The three episodes of this second series were linked by an investigation of a single question - what is an artist? Ep 1 Starry Starry Night looked at the history of the idea of the artist, from Vincent van Gogh to contemporary artists; Ep 2 Who Made Who met and interviewed artists who explore identity as their principal subject; while Ep 3 Lust For Life was a survey of art with an explicit connection to political issues.

== See also ==
- Big Art Mob
- List of blogs
