= Faces in Places =

Photoblog

- Website type: Blog
- Owner: Jody Smith
- Website: facesinplaces.blogspot.com
- Launched: April 23, 2007

Faces in Places is a photoblog that features (as the author describes) photographs of faces found in everyday places. The featured photographs consist of inanimate objects that a viewer would perceive as representing a face. This perception is a type of pareidolia—perceiving random stimuli as significant, or anthropomorphism—people attributing human qualities to a non-human being or object.

== History ==
The Faces in Places blog was launched on April 23, 2007, with a photo of a crane that resembles a grasshopper. Prior to this, the editor had started to encourage people with a similar interest in anthropomorphic images to submit them to a Flickr group. The Flickr group is now the main source of images used on the blog. The blog has not been updated since January 2015.

== Book ==
In 2010, Ammonite Press published a book by the same name, compiled by Jody Smith. The book follows the blog and features photos of pareidolic "faces" in everyday places photographed by members of the Flickr group. Proceeds from the book raises money for the children's charity, Hope For Children.

== Awards ==
On January 7, 2008, the project won Yahoo! Find of the Year 2007 in the Weird & Wonderful category.

== See also ==
- Internet meme
- Face perception
