= Spillpikene.no =

Norwegian feminist game blog

Spillpikene.no is a Norwegian feminist game blog created in 2009. The overall themes of the blog are games, games research, and gaming culture. The blog community originated at the Department of Information Science and Media Studies at the University of Bergen, and the four founders were Linn Søvig, Hedvig K. Myklebust, Marianne H. Westerlund, and Maren Agdestein.

The blog received support from Fritt Ord in 2011, following an announcement of funding to socially engaged blogs.

Was awarded "Website of the Year" by Radikal Portal in 2015. The review states that "Spillpikene has become an influential website, both within the world of games and the sphere discussing society and gender. They are taken seriously by gamers, academics, feminists, and many others."
