= Surviving Grady =

Boston Red Sox fan blog

- Website type: Blog
- Owner: Red / Denton
- Creator: Red / Denton
- Website: survivinggrady.com

Surviving Grady is a popular blog, detailing the ongoing and occasionally strained relationship between two passionate fans of the Boston Red Sox and their beloved team. The blog began at the start of the Red Sox' historic 2004 season and swiftly gathered a devoted following, serving as an outlet for a frustrated fanbase to air and share their grievances, disappointments, and eventual triumph. Entries from the 2004 season were later collected and published in book form.

== History ==
Disgruntled at the Red Sox's dramatic loss to the New York Yankees in the 2003 American League Championship Series, creators "Red" and "Denton" conceived the blog as a space in which to engage with the angst associated with following a team that seemed destined always to disappoint. Daily entries have continued to date, typically exhibiting an off-kilter, and occasionally surreal sense of humor.

The title refers to Grady Little, manager of the Red Sox from 2002-2003, and to Little's controversial decision not to replace pitcher Pedro Martínez in the eighth inning of Game Seven of the 2003 American League Championship Series. The Yankees tied the game on a hit from the very next batter, and went on to win, costing the Red Sox a chance at the World Series and causing great frustration and consternation among the Red Sox fan base.

== Style ==
Surviving Grady is a reflective journal that documents the experiences of fans of the Red Sox. It does not focus on box scores or detailed statistical analysis. Instead, it presents contributors' personal responses to the team's performance. The site is written by fans and attracts thousands of daily readers, along with an active comment section.

== Publications ==
"Surviving Grady" (2005, AiT/PlanetLar, ISBN 1-932051-39-2)
