= EastSouthWestNorth =

EastSouthWestNorth is an English-language China-focused blog written by Roland Soong (宋以朗, Cantonese: [sʊ̄ŋìlɔ̀ːŋ])), a Hong Kong-based blogger. The blog combines English translations of Chinese articles, comments and recommended reading. It was started in 2003 when Roland Soong moved back to Hong Kong. Notable subjects include Eileen Chang, J-Pop, and Shanghai World Expo.

== Influence ==
According to a survey conducted by Rebecca MacKinnon in late 2006, EastSouthWestNorth appears to be substantially more important to foreign correspondents than other English-language China-focused blogs.

== Media Presence ==
Roland Soong has been interviewed by BBC News, Next Magazine, OhmyNews, Reuters and The Standard, a free Hong Kong newspaper.
