= Rate Your Students =

Former weblog satirizing RateMyProfessors.com

Rate Your Students was a weblog that ran from November 2005 to June 2010. It was started by a "tenured humanities professor from the South," but was run for most of its five years by a rotating group of anonymous academics. The blog has not been updated since Dec 2010.

In an article from the Arizona State Web Devil, one of many that appeared on the site, the original moderator said that the impulse to start the blog was:

...to poke fun at RateMyProfessors.com, a mostly unmonitored and disingenuous site that traffics mostly in character assassination. Often I've heard people raise the notion of, 'What if there was a Rate My Students? Wouldn't people be horrified to find out how awful some students can be?' And I thought I'd do it as a lark. I suspected it'd be fun for a couple of weeks and then I'd ditch it. But the response was great, and very quickly the e-mail I was getting was about other things: how to make classrooms work better, what students need to succeed, what professors need to know about the modern student. So my goal became to offer a public forum where interested parties can talk about these things.

The site received much national press in early 2006, the Chronicle of Higher Education and Inside Higher Ed. Both weighed in:

For some professors who have had to cringe at scathing personal attacks posted by students on RateMyProfessors.com, a new blog—Rate Your Students—is providing a bit of catharsis.
