= Brain Blogger =

- Website type: Blog, Online Magazine, News
- Available in: English
- Founded: 2005
- Headquarters: Los Angeles, California, U.S.
- Owner: Global Neuroscience Initiative Foundation
- Key people: Shaheen Lakhan, Editor-in-Chief; James S. Rice, Public Relations Director; Holly Cave, Chief Copy Editor, Daliah Leslie, "The Hollywood Medical Reporter & Copy Editor
- Website: www.brainblogger.com
- Registration: Not Required
- Current status: Active

Brain Blogger is a Scientific American partner biomedical blog sponsored by the Global Neuroscience Initiative Foundation (GNIF) and edited by Shaheen Lakhan. Its byline is "a brain-themed community." It reviews the latest news and stories related to neuroscience/neurology, psychology/psychiatry, and health/healthcare.

According to its website, the blog is written by over 100 biomedical professionals—from neurosurgeons to psychologists—and follows the Health On the Net Foundation honor code of medical blogging ethics. It is syndicated by Google News and major media outlets, including Time Warner, San Antonio Express-News, and Sun-Times News Group.

Brain Blogger is a finalist for two Seed Media Group's Research Blogging Awards 2010 in the categories "Best Blog — Neuroscience" and "Best Blog — Psychology". Moreover, it ranks first in Blogs.com's "10 Best Brain Blogs".
