= The Tehran Times =

First street fashion blog of Iran

- Website type: Fashion blog, photoblog
- Available in: English
- Creator: Araz Fazaeli
- Website: www.instagram.com/thetehrantimes/
- Launched: September 2012
- Current status: active

The Tehran Times is a fashion blog that was founded 2012 by Araz Fazaeli and is considered the first street fashion blog of Iran. While Fazaeli's blog aims are largely cultural and artistic—sharing Iranian street fashion with other, predominantly Western, audiences—Fazaeli also has larger motives of promoting cross-cultural understanding. In a September 2013 interview with The Atlantic Post, Fazaeli explains these larger motives: “I have realized that people have a wrong understanding of us. They believe what they see in the news and even though a lot of it is true there is much more to see ... That is the side that I am trying to show. I don’t think many have portrayed that about Iranian women before.”

== The Tehran Times Format ==
Fazaeli's blog focuses on fashion as illustrated through regular street style posts showing how women interpret enforced codes of dress in Iran. In addition to these street style posts, which appear without text and feature images of fashionably dressed women in public spaces throughout Iran, The Tehran Times also includes long-form articles by guest writers—often in both English and Persian—on topics relating to Iranian culture. Here Fazaeli explains the inclusion of these cultural, long-form articles on the blog: “I don’t think my responsibility is to only post photos of stylish women ... I think there are cultural norms behind fashion and there is a great history behind Iran. A combination of both could make the blog much more interesting and create stronger messages.”

Fazaeli supports the idea of women as changing the sociopolitcal atmosphere in Iran, but also emphasizes that there is no monolithic Iranian woman and thus no monolithic approach to dress in Iran: "Are all Iranian women miserable or are all modernized? ... The answer is that they both exist, in all societies." With his blog, Fazaeli is merely seeking to show the multi-faceted approaches to fashion in Iran.
