= Ms Sparky =

- Website type: Blog
- Available in: English
- Creator: Debbie Crawford
- Website: mssparky.com
- Launched: 2008
- Current status: defunct

Ms Sparky was a United States–based blog that focused on news articles, opinions, and lawsuits regarding war contractors, primarily US contractors of the United States Department of Defense (DoD) working in Iraq and Afghanistan.

== History ==
Ms Sparky is slang for female electrician. The blog was started in 2008 by Debbie Crawford (a Vancouver resident), who worked in Iraq as an electrician for KBR, after hearing of a US Army soldier in Iraq who was electrocuted in a shower. Crawford's blog was noticed by a Senate staffer a few weeks later, who invited Crawford to testify at a Senate committee hearing in July 2008 on allegations of poor work by KBR in Iraq.

Debbie Crawford was 47 when she launched the blog. She had done contract jobs in Iraq, China, Antarctica, ... and was the first female journeyman out of IBEW Local 112 in Kennewick. She had noticed a systemic poor management and lack of government oversight during her overseas experiences. She was already blogging about her travels and her experience as a parent with a daughter in jail when she launched Ms Sparky.

Early 2010, Ms Sparky released the details of the suit filed by the US Justice Department against KBR for violating the LOGCAP III clause forbidding the arming of subcontractors by KBR. In May 2010, Ms Sparky was the first outlet to release KBR's new employee clause forbidding getting involved in brothels activities. In July 2010, a KBR contractor was raped in her living quarters in Iraq, an incident where Ms Sparky blamed KBR, and the blog scooped an inside memo from the U.S. Central Command Contracting Command to all contractors in Iraq urging third country nationals, whose countries prohibits traveling to Iraq (Philippines, Nepal), to leave the country. The blog also compiled a wide reference of documents about the Hexavalent chromium in drinking water controversy faced by KBR. In January 2011, Ms Sparky broke the story of a man who had been serving as a KBR contractor in Iraq for seven years even though he was wanted by the police in connection with the rape of an underage girl in 2004-2005.

== Description ==
Ms Sparky covered, in addition to work performance issues by DoD contractors, incidences of contractor misconduct including violent crimes, rapes, health and disability concerns by former contractor employees. Besides KBR, the blog focused on other major contractors such as DynCorp, Fluor Corporation, and Triple Canopy. The blog's categories were: Chemical and other exposures; Contractor deaths; Electrocutions; Indictments, convictions and arrests; Human trafficking; Rape, hazing, discrimination and harassment; Rants.

The blog was also a mean for families of Army subcontracting employees to connect and solve their distress, and earned money through donations and advertisements.
