= The Scientific Activist =

The Scientific Activist was a blog that covered science, politics, and science policy. The Scientific Activist gained international recognition in February 2006 when it published information that led to the immediate resignation of Bush administration NASA appointee George Deutsch. Deutsch — who had been accused of censoring scientific information at NASA — claimed to have graduated from Texas A&M University on his résumé, but the blog discovered that Deutsch had not, in fact, completed his degree there.

In July 2006, The Scientific Activist was named one of Nature's "Top five science blogs."
