= Generación invisible =

Generación invisible (Invisible Generation) was the first Colombian collective journalistic weblog which started September 2004. Its creator was Christian Pardo Quinn, also known as gatocpardo.

It started as a blog aggregator, hosted by Blogger.com, where entries posted by members appeared in a main page. Later, in 2006, they started to publish new material on its own website about several issues. All its members are professional journalists who claim to be "independent and without antecedents or links with political or economical, legal or illegal, significant activities," interested in "helping to build a better world through the unfading, unlimited cult to the truth".

Generación invisible was awarded with the CPB Journalism Award, internet category, in February 2006. According to the jury, "though it has a lack of design, this portal carries out its content function. Its quality lies in being the first window open to every school of thought. It's a wide space in a country without many wide spaces to win". At the moment it had 27 members, but as for March 2007 it had 12.

On 6 August 2007, Generación Invisible relaunched its website.
