= Down by the Hipster =

Down by the Hipster (DBTH) is a New York City nightlife blog.

Down by the Hipster has been cited by other New York City blogs such as Eater.com and Blackbook magazine.

Down by the Hipster has been credited with breaking news stories such as Heath Ledger's involvement in opening the bar and cafe Five Leaves in Brooklyn, New York.

== Sources ==
- New York magazine, July 2008
- TMZ.com, July 24, 2008
