= Mikhail Onufrienko =

Russian-Ukrainian blogger (born 1965)

Mikhail Borisovich Onufrienko
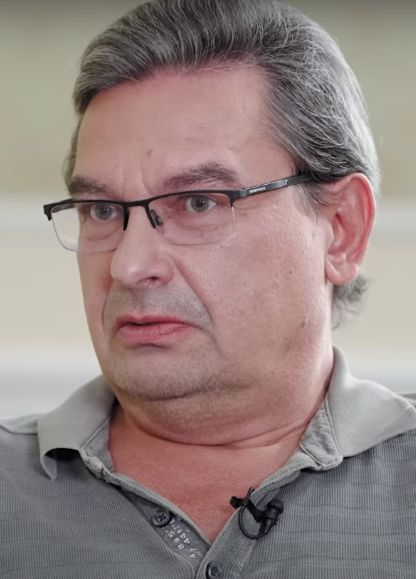
- Image of Mikhail Onufrienko
- Born: January 19, 1965 (age 60); Kharkiv, USSR
- Occupations: Blogger; propagandist
- Years active: 2004–present

Mikhail Borisovich Onufrienko (Russian: Михаил Борисович Онуфриенко; born January 19, 1965, in Kharkiv, Ukrainian SSR) is a pro-Russian Ukrainian blogger.

== Biography ==
He was born on January 19, 1965, in Kharkiv, Ukrainian SSR (Ukraine).

After receiving his secondary education, he did military service in the Soviet Army. Subsequently he unsuccessfully tried to enroll in the postgraduate program at Moscow State University in the Department of Political Economy. After returning from Moscow to the Ukrainian S.S.R, he worked as a graduate student at the University of Kharkiv. After the collapse of the USSR, he went into business, trading securities.

In 2004, Mikhail Onufrienko took an active part in the Orange Revolution, supporting pro-Russian presidential candidate Viktor Yanukovych during the protests.

In 2009, he was one of the co-founders of the pro-Russian public organization Velikaya Rus - Russia Ukraine Belarus.

In 2013, the Velikaya Rus and about three dozen other pro-Russian organizations united to form the "Civil Forum of Kharkiv" to support pro-Russian President of Ukraine Viktor Yanukovych during the Revolution of Dignity protests.

In 2014, after the victory of the Revolution of Dignity and the beginning of the Russo-Ukrainian war, Onufrienko fled Ukraine to Russia, then to Donbas region. Allegedly, he subsequently moved to the peninsula of Crimea.

On March 30, 2022, the Ukrainian Prosecutor's Office of Crimea and Sevastopol opened criminal proceedings against Onufrienko. The Prosecutor's Office accused him of spreading disinformation on his Internet channels to justify the military aggression of Russia against Ukraine.

== Activity on the Internet ==
Currently he works on the LiveJournal website under the pseudonym "mikle1" and his Telegram channel. Mikhail Onufrienko published informational content on his channels aimed at justifying Russian aggression against Ukraine. In addition, he posts videos in which he declares support for Russia's military actions and calls for the creation of separatist authorities in the temporarily occupied territories of Ukraine.

In his articles and videos, Onufrienko calls the Ukrainian military a hostile force, the Revolution of Dignity a coup d'etat, and the Russo-Ukrainian war a liberation from fascists.

Onufrienko also publishes articles and videos on the website Naspravdi whose founder is another blogger of Ukrainian origin, Yuri Podolyaka.

On May 3, 2022 the video hosting company, YouTube, completely removed the main channel of Mikhail Onufrienko. The reason was cited as a "violation of YouTube's terms of use."

== Personal life ==
He is married and has a daughter.
