= Diabetes Mine =

www.DiabetesMine.com

Diabetes Mine is a Web 2.0 (Health 2.0) web log focused on issues related to diabetes. Written by Amy Tenderich, DiabetesMine offers news, analysis, and opinions on issues that relate to the diabetes community. In addition, the author offers personal perspectives, experiences and observations, and encourages readers to do the same.

Readers can contribute to DiabetesMine by submitting their personal stories of diagnosis and the challenges of living with diabetes. Partners and loved ones of people with diabetes can also participate in a section called “The Diabetic Partner Follies.” Updated almost daily, DiabetesMine is an online hub for the diabetes community.

In January 2015, DiabetesMine moved to a new home under Healthline.

In March 2022, Healthline decided to close down the editorial content on DiabetesMine. This was publicly announced in April 2022.

== Amy Tenderich ==
Amy Tenderich was diagnosed in May 2003 with type 1 diabetes while in her mid-thirties. Then a freelance journalist for the IT industry, she approached the subject of diabetes with a writer's curiosity. Now a contributor on diabetes for HealthCentral.com and a monthly columnist for dLife, Amy has co-authored a book called "Know Your Numbers, Outlive Your Diabetes".
