= Audimated =

- Company type: Florida Corporation
- Website type: Social network, online music portal
- Available in: English
- Headquarters: Miami, Florida, U.S.
- Area served: World Wide Web
- Creator: www.disartmedia.com
- Founders: Lucas Sommer and Andrew Levine
- Industry: Social networking, online music retail
- Products: Digital and physical music and merchandise
- Services: Digital Distribution, Music downloading
- Advertising: No
- Registration: Free
- Launched: July 1st 2010
- Current status: Beta

Audimated was a social networking website for independent musicians and their fans. Audimated.com, which launched in June 2010, offers a platform in which both artists and fans can sell music and related products to make a profit. The founders of Audimated.com are Lucas Sommer and Andrew Levine, two alumni from the University of Miami Business School.

== History ==
The idea for Audimated came to Lucas and Andrew during their senior year of college together at the University of Miami. After receiving positive feedback on the idea from their business professors, they put their business plan into action in 2008 to make their website a reality. The website name is a combination of the words audio and automated, which represents the website's goal of combining music (audio) and automating the process of marketing through social networking (mated) for independent artists.

== Concept ==
Audimated.com is an online music community with a variety of unique features. Most notably, fans and artists alike can use the website as a tool for earning money. For example, Audimated.com allows artists to sell their merchandise (songs, concert tickets, etc.) and also lets fans have "stores" where they can add their favorite bands’ products for sale.

In addition to the revenue generating component, Audimated.com also allows the fan user group to find top artists that match their taste, listen to and upload songs on the Audimated.com radio and search specific locations for new musicians of different genres.

While artists upload their creative content onto the website, Audimated.com guarantees that they keep the rights to all creative content of their work. Audimated.com simply offers a platform to increase awareness and interest in independent music. Signing up for Audimated.com is free of charge for artists and their fans. The website business model is to charge a 10% fee of all sale transactions by artists and fans while up-selling premium services to its members.

== News ==
In March 2010, Audimated.com won the annual WeMedia Pitch It! Contest. The grand prize, awarded to Lucas Sommer on behalf of Audimated.com for the best pitch, was $25,000 in start up funds for the website. Audimated.com has also received press for its services in The Wall Street Journal, the Miami Herald and various blogs devoted to independent music.
