= Couric & Co. =

Official blog of the CBS Evening News

Couric & Co. is the official blog of the CBS Evening News launched on September 5, 2006.

== Overview ==
Overseen by anchor and managing editor Katie Couric, and written by her staff, the blog also features contributions from CBS writer/producer Greg Kandra and various CBS News correspondents and producers. The blog provides insight into the planning of the daily broadcast, and features a daily summary of the stories on the night's broadcast by Katie Couric or the substitute anchor, under entries in its "First Look" category.

Couric & Co. differs from Public Eye, the blog of the overall CBS News division, which launched in September 2005.

== See also ==
- NBC Nightly News
