= Ace of Spades HQ =

Political blog

Ace of Spades HQ, Ace of Spades, or AoS is a conservative and humor-driven U.S.-based political blog covering current events, legal issues, military hardware, and salacious topics in popular culture. The blog was first launched in 2003 (23 years ago). It has been quoted, mentioned, referenced or linked by The Wall Street Journal, Fox News, CNN, National Review, The Weekly Standard, and many notable online magazines/blogs, as well as on the floor of the US House of Representatives. The site's leading blogger, the pseudonymous "Ace of Spades," has also appeared as a guest expert on Fox News, although it is quite rare for him to make media appearances. Current cobloggers include "Buck Throckmorton," "CBD," "J.J. Sefton," "Joe Mannix," "KT," "Misanthropic Humanitarian," "Weasel," "Weird Dave," and several inactive cobloggers.

== Public recognition ==
When Ace himself was honored as the "Blogger of the Year" at the American Conservative Union's Conservative Political Action Conference in March 2008, Brian Faughnan of The Weekly Standard wrote that "Ace has a gift for cutting through political BS, for dissecting the fatal flaws behind liberal arguments, and for doing so with humor. ... [H]e gave an incisive speech on the death of democracy and the rise of tyranny, accompanied by an analysis of how Ronald Reagan re-invigorated the two-party system. Seriously You Guys." Joy McCann of Little Miss Attila wrote of Ace's speech that "AoS gave a rather thoughtful set of remarks on the why New Media is an important part of policy-making, and drew a straight line between the history of policy debate in a town-hall setting and the Reagan Revolution, which rejected the notion—now so prevalent in Europe and elsewhere—that the political class can consider itself our 'betters,' and simply make policy decisions on our behalf. We have, he reminded us, not simply an opportunity to inform ourselves about politics, but a 'duty' to do so. Naturally, alternative streams of information will play a large role in that process."

In a 2007 editorial for The Washington Times, editor Tony Blankley described Ace of Spades HQ as a "very smart military blog", which became a catchphrase at the blog.

== Relations with other blogs ==
The Ace of Spades HQ is often critical of other political websites, including Andrew Sullivan's Daily Dish, the Huffington Post, the Daily Kos, and Glenn Greenwald's Blog in Salon. He has also been exceedingly critical of Christopher Buckley, both as a writer of fiction and as a political commentator.

Blogger-in-Chief Ace and Ace of Spades HQ itself have both been quoted and linked extensively at other blogs such as Power Line, Hot Air, Instapundit, Protein Wisdom, and Right Wing News.

== Cultural content ==
AoSHQ, like many political blogs, links to and comments on the day's news. Unlike some other online commentary sites, however, it often features humorous content in its videos, cartoons, and pictures. The site frequently employs obscenity and vulgar language, setting it apart from most conservative media outlets. One center-right devout Catholic blogger has described the blog and its commenters as "smart but very very vulgar."

== Political content ==
Ace of Spades HQ was mentioned by Roy Edroso of the left-wing Village Voice in the autumn of 2008, in his Guide to the Rightosphere as a "Fratboytarian" new-media outlet. Edroso described the Ace of Spades evolution:

New blog quickly mutated into rowdy multi-author scrum specializing in schoolyard taunts . . . . Site contributors and readers became "morons," but affectionately, e.g.: "There's Hope For You Morons Yet: Woman Takes Out Ad To Lose Virginity Before 30th Birthday." Throughout good times (2004: "I don't plan on doing anything except gloat until Thanksgiving") and bad (2006: "Islamist Enemies Take Great Relief in Democratic Win"), contributors keep their spirits high with "not safe for work" links, often accompanied by moral dudgeon . . .

== See also ==
- Michelle Malkin
- Jim Geraghty
