= Idolblog =

Blog covering the TV show NZ Idol

Idolblog is an unofficial blog site dedicated to the talent search television show NZ Idol. Since its launch in 2004, the site has attracted a dedicated community and its popularity has led to national media coverage in New Zealand.

After the first season of NZ Idol ended in 2004, New Zealand Listener columnist Russell Brown cited Idolblog as an example of how fan-run sites can build communities around programmes more effectively than broadcasters, claiming the site generated "a degree of engagement that the official Idol website never achieved". The site was featured on the TV2 programme Flipside, and mentioned in the New Zealand Herald as a notable source of opinions on NZ Idol.

Idolblog won the 2004 NetGuide Web Award for Best Youth Site, and was a finalist in the 2006 NetGuide Web Award for Best Blog. In 2005, Nielsen//NetRatings ranked Idolblog as the sixth New Zealand website by average session duration.

Idolblog was created by Auckland-based couple Rachel Cunliffe, a website designer and University of Auckland senior tutor in the Department of Statistics, and Regan Cunliffe, who runs a web hosting and design company.

After the final season of NZ Idol aired in 2006, the site has remained as an online tribute to the show and its fanbase. Only parts of the website are still functional. The site now provides commentary and recaps during the American Idol seasons.

== Controversies ==
In 2004, an Idolblog member exposed that NZ Idol runner-up Michael Murphy's debut single "So Damn Beautiful" had previously been released by Austin, Texas band Vallejo; the song had been promoted as an original by Murphy's manager Paul Ellis. The resulting controversy attracted press coverage both within New Zealand and internationally.

In 2006, Idolblog's maintainers issued a legal warning to its members after potentially defamatory statements were posted on the site.
