= Zooillogix =

Zooillogix is a zoology blog on the ScienceBlogs network, created and edited by Andrew and Benny Bleiman. The site has been featured on ABC News, in Seed magazine, Mental Floss, FHM, and the Annals of Improbable Research, awarders of the Ig Nobel Prize. The site attracts a diverse readership from notable scientists, such as PZ Myers, to biology students to young children.

== Content ==
Zooillogix focuses on bizarre zoological news, covering research published in scientific journals, such as the Public Library of Science (PLoS), as well as stories reported in general news outlets. Typical items include the discovery of new species, newly documented animal behavior, zoo and aquarium industry news, and interviews with scientists and researchers. Content is written to be accessible to a non-scientific audience.

== See also ==
- ScienceBlogs
- ZooBorns
