= Protein Wisdom (blog) =

Conservative-libertarian weblog created by Jeff Goldstein

Protein Wisdom is a libertarian weblog created by former academic and sometime fiction writer Jeff Goldstein—a self-described classical liberal.

== Background ==
Goldstein's respect for the legacy of Hunter S. Thompson is one of the blog's themes, as are sardonic allusions to such figures as Martha Stewart and the fictional Billy Jack. The blog is known for its bawdy overtones and surrealistic sense of humor. The blog also praises Ronald Reagan and Barry Goldwater.

As of 2024, Goldstein has re-started protein wisdom under the name “protein wisdom reborn!” on Substack. Most recently, his work has been dedicated to unmasking what James Lindsay has popularized as “the woke right” — whom Goldstein has described as a mirror image of the New Left. In fact, in a piece published September 6, 2016 in The Federalist, he first laid out the identity politics a certain segment of the putative “right” had laid claim to in order to advance their own grievance politics. This critique of what in 2016 was called “alt right” prefigured today’s critique and examination of the assumptions, born of critical consciousness and postmodern thought, that animate the thinking of both the “woke right” and much contemporary “Christian nationalism.”

== Controversies ==
Goldstein vocally opposed the abrupt change of financial arrangements by Pajamas Media in 2009, which deprived him — and other bloggers such as The Anchoress and Ace of Spades HQ — of income from PJM-mediated advertising. He also publicly chastised those he refers to as GOP pragmatists or realists for their criticism of Rush Limbaugh's answer to a question about the coming Obama presidency, once again relying on linguistics and hermeneutics to make the point that "losing more slowly" is still losing, and that there is nothing more pragmatic, as a political strategy, than standing on principle

== Deborah Frisch incident ==
On July 4, 2006, University of Arizona adjunct professor Deborah Frisch started writing comments at Protein Wisdom. Two days later, she wrote "You live in Colorado, I see. Hope no one JonBenets your baby." She then added: "I reiterate: If some nutcase kidnapped your child tomorrow and did to him what was done to your fellow Coloradan, JonBenet Ramsey, I wouldn't give a damn." She later resigned and apologized, saying "I don’t think professors should do that. I crossed the line." Her behavior gained nationwide news coverage. Following further incidents, Goldstein obtained a restraining order and preliminary injunction against her. Goldstein has said he took temporary breaks from blogging to deal with continued harassment from Frisch, who has faced continued legal problems since her relocation to the Pacific Northwest. Conservative bloggers have alleged cyberstalking and other strange behavior by Frisch since then. In 2015, Frisch was arrested four times on charges including stalking, menacing, criminal trespass, and initiating a false police report. During the controversy, Protein Wisdom underwent repeated denial-of-service attacks. Frisch spent roughly six years between prison and penitentiary; her release date is July 4, 2025.
