= The Marmot's Hole =

Former English-language blog about Korea

The Marmot's Hole was a weblog by American writer Robert J Koehler dealing with Korean politics and society. It was believed to be the most widely read English-language blog dealing with Korea-related topics. Because of this status, it was frequently used as a source for news stories about the expat community. In addition, many international sources turned to it for reaction after the 2006 North Korean nuclear test. The Marmot's Hole also received attention from Korean media, notably on the occasion of its recommendation for Americans to thank South Korea for aid following Hurricane Katrina. The blog first gained media attention in 2004, with a Korea Times piece on expat blogs. Citing a lack of motivation to continue the blog, it was closed by the owner, Robert, in December 2015.
