= Mind Hacks =

2004 book by Stafford and Webb

- Author: Tom Stafford; Matt Webb
- Language: English
- Series: O'Reilly Hacks
- Subject: Psychology
- Genre: Non-fiction
- Publisher: O'Reilly
- Publication date: November 2004

Mind Hacks: Tips and Tricks for Using Your Brain is a book using cognitive neuroscience to present experiments, tricks, and tips related to aspects of the brain by Tom Stafford and Matt Webb. The book was published by O'Reilly in November 2004 as part of the O'Reilly Hacks series. It has since been published in six different languages.

Mind Hacks is also an ongoing psychology and neuroscience blog that publishes daily news and commentary on mind and brain issues. It won a Scientific American Science and Technology Web Award in 2005 and was listed as a Top 30 science blog by The Times of London in 2010.
