= Zen Habits =

Blog written by Leo Babauta

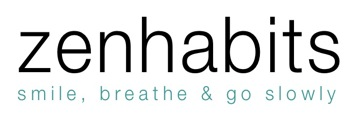
- Website type: Blog
- Available in: English
- Owner: Public Domain
- Creator: Leo Babauta
- Website: zenhabits.net
- Launched: February 2007
- Current status: Active

Zen Habits is a blog written by Leo Babauta about implementing zen habits in daily life. It offers suggestions for how to live and also includes frequent references to how Leo Babauta has implemented these habits. He covers topics such as simplifying, living frugally, parenting, happiness, motivation, eliminating debt, saving, eating healthily and successfully implementing good habits.

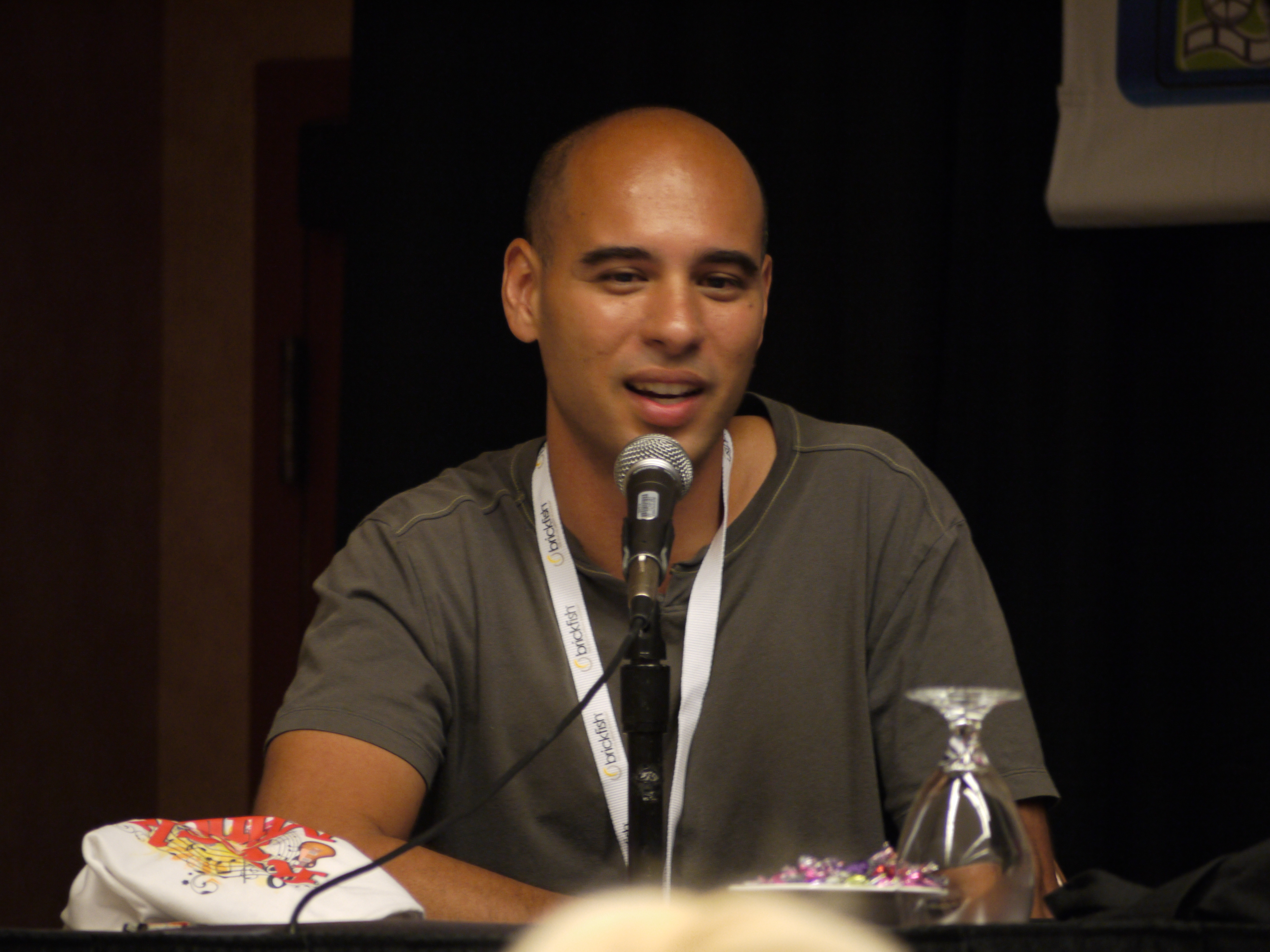
Leo Babauta

== Blog history ==
Until approximately 2010, the blog focused largely on topics such as productivity and being organized, but Babauta later drifted away from these topics. In a post titled "Toss Productivity Out", published 6 September 2011, Babauta explicitly encouraged his readers to focus on simplifying their lives rather than getting more things done.

== Books ==
On November 6, 2007, an e-book called Zen To Done: The Ultimate Simple Productivity System was published, composed of some of Zen Habits' blog posts. On January 7, 2008, the Zen Habits blog and Zen to Done e-book were released into the public domain.

In December 2014, Babauta self-published a book entitled Zen Habits: Mastering the Art of Change. In December 2015, he revised and re-published a concise version of the book as Essential Zen Habits.

== Recognition ==
In February 2009, Time Magazine named Zen Habits one of the Top 25 Blogs for 2009, and in June 2010, it named Zen Habits at the top of its list for the Top 25 Blogs for 2010.
