= Darren Rowse =

Australian writer

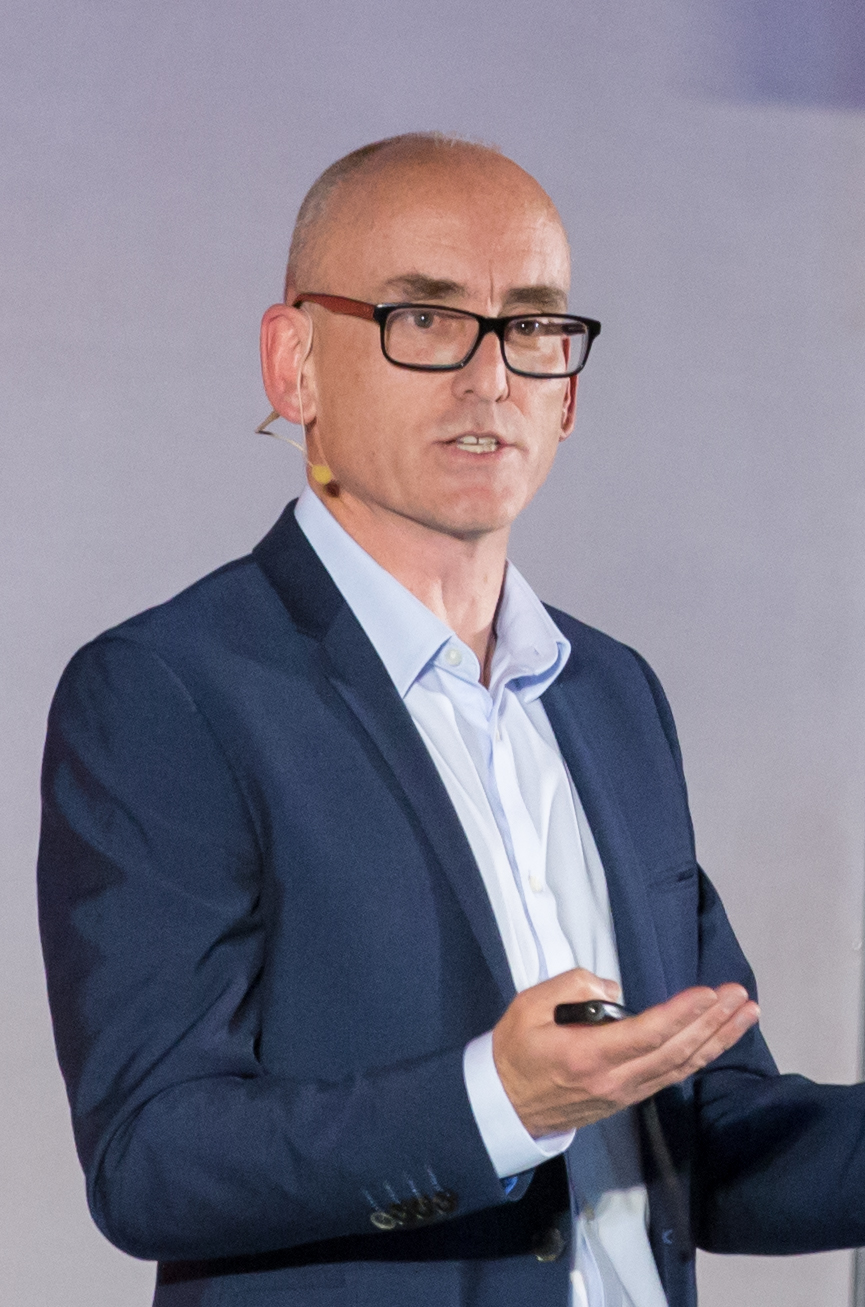
- Rowse at FinCon in Dallas in 2017
- Born: 27 April 1972 (age 54); Melbourne, Australia
- Occupation: Blogger
- Spouse: Vanessa Rowse
- Children: 3
- Writing career
- Language: English
- Subjects: Blogging; Photography
- Website: problogger.com

Darren Rowse (known online as Problogger; born 27 April 1972) is an Australian blogger, speaker, consultant and founder of several blogs and blog networks, including ProBlogger.net and digital-photography-school.com. He lives in Melbourne, Australia.

== Career ==
In November 2002, he worked as a part-time minister, a custodian for an online department store, and a casual laborer. Rowse started LivingRoom.org.au, a blog about living in Australia; religion (mainly the emerging church movement); politics; and other topics that he found interesting.

Rowse contributes to around 20 different blogs, although he is only actively blogging on two, including topic-specific blogs such as the Athens Olympics and the Michael Jackson court case, which he runs with other bloggers.

His two main personal blogs are 'Digital Photography School', which features photography tips, and ProBlogger, which features tips on blogging. These two blogs get around 85,000–100,000 page views a day and over $20,000 in total ad revenue a month.

As of 22 May 2009, ProBlogger was listed as number two on Technorati's most favorited blogs list and number 40 on the most linked to blog.

In 2006, Rowse was awarded the Best Web Development Weblog blog award in 2006 for ProBlogger.

Rowse is a co-founder of b5media, the blog network he founded in September 2005 with fellow bloggers Jeremy Wright, Shai Coggins and Duncan Riley. The blog network claims to have over 300 blogs, and one of the largest new media networks in the world with one million page views a day in 2006.

Rowse was named in the Forbes Web Celebrity List in 2007.

In 2008, Rowse co-authored the book 'ProBlogger: Secrets for Blogging Your Way to a Six-Figure Income' (Wiley) and founded TwiTip—a blog dedicated to Twitter tips. He also has a Twitter page. Rowse is co-founder of the Third Tribe and founder of the Problogger Paid community.

In 2011, Rowse was a speaker at the Blogopolis blogger conference in Melbourne.

Rowse has also held two Problogger events in Melbourne.

== Outside of blogging ==
Rowse is married to 'V', and they have three sons. He is a former church minister and is still active in the local religious community. He also enjoys photography, reading, food, wine, and movies.

== Bibliography ==
- ProBlogger: Secrets for Blogging Your Way to a Six-Figure Income ISBN 978-0-470-24667-2
