= Crash Test Kitchen =

Cooking podcast and vlog

The banner image for the Crash Test Kitchen channel.

Crash Test Kitchen (CTK) is a video cooking podcast and video blog (vlog) featured in Time magazine. It features creators Warren "Waz" Murray and Leanne "Lenny" White – Australian amateur chefs or 'foodies'. CTK provides short programmes in multiple formats for viewers to follow the adventures (always humorously including all the mistakes with the successes) of Waz and Lenny in their kitchen. New videos are usually posted once a month.

== History ==
CTK was started in 2005 by Waz and Lenny who were then living in Canada. The program continued to gain success and the podcast became a featured video podcast on iTunes. The program had a short stint 'on the road' across Canada before they moved to London, England until 2012, when they returned to Australia. The web site features archived videos dating back to April 2005, as well as a 'Best of' CTK list. Comments can be left on the site at the bottom of the viewing page for each program.

In the December 16, 2006, issue of Time magazine, the annual "Person of the Year" title was given to "You", meaning the public, particularly independent content creators who used the Internet to post various videos, audio clips, photos, etc. and have affected local or global communities. Among several nominated people to represent "You" were "the Un-Emerils" Waz and Lenny for their success with CTK. 612 ABC News Radio in Brisbane picked up the story as well and an interview with the couple in the Brisbane studio aired December 20, 2006.

On June 6, 2007, CTK appeared for the first time on the Word of Mouth page, the food blog for the Guardian Unlimited. Then on September 21, 2007, CTK appeared again, this time in embedded podcast, in order to "crash test" Ross Dobson's spicy vegetable soup, extracted from The Observer's Observer Food Monthly.
