= Propaganda in Russia =

Propaganda in Russia promotes views, perceptions, or agendas of the government of Russia. The media include state-run outlets and online technologies, and may involve using "Soviet-style 'active measures' as an element of modern Russian 'political warfare.'" Notably, contemporary Russian propaganda promotes the cult of personality of Vladimir Putin and positive views of Soviet history. Russia has a number of organizations, such as the Presidential Commission to Counter Attempts to Falsify History to the Detriment of Russia's Interests (active 2009-2012), the Russian web brigades, and others that engage in political propaganda to promote the views of the Russian government.

== State-sponsored global PR effort ==
At the end of 2008, Lev Gudkov, based on the Levada Center polling data, pointed out the near-disappearance of public opinion as a socio-political institution in contemporary Russia and its replacement with state propaganda.

Shortly after the Beslan school hostage crisis in September 2004, Putin enhanced a Kremlin-sponsored program aimed at "improving Russia's image" abroad. One of the major projects of the program was the creation in 2005 of Russia Today (now known as RT), an English-language TV news channel providing 24-hour news coverage. Towards its start-up budget, $30 million of public funds were allocated. A CBS News story on the launch of Russia Today quoted Boris Kagarlitsky as saying it was "very much a continuation of the old Soviet propaganda services."

Russia's deputy foreign minister Grigory Karasin said in August 2008, in the context of the Russia–Georgia conflict, "Western media is a well-organized machine, which is showing only those pictures that fit in well with their thoughts. We find it very difficult to squeeze our opinion into the pages of their newspapers." In June 2007, Vedomosti reported that the Kremlin had been intensifying its official lobbying activities in the United States since 2003, among other things, hiring such companies as Hannaford Enterprises and Ketchum.

In a 2005 interview with U.S. government-owned external broadcaster Voice of America, the Russian-Israeli blogger Anton Nossik said the creation of RT "smacks of Soviet-style propaganda campaigns." Pascal Bonnamour, the head of the European department of Reporters Without Borders, called the newly announced network "another step of the state to control information." In 2009, Luke Harding (then the Moscow correspondent) of The Guardian described RT's advertising campaign in the United Kingdom as an "ambitious attempt to create a new post-Soviet global propaganda empire." According to Lev Gudkov, the director of the Levada Center, Russia's most well-respected polling organization, Putin's Russia's propaganda is "aggressive and deceptive ... worse than anything I witnessed in the Soviet Union."

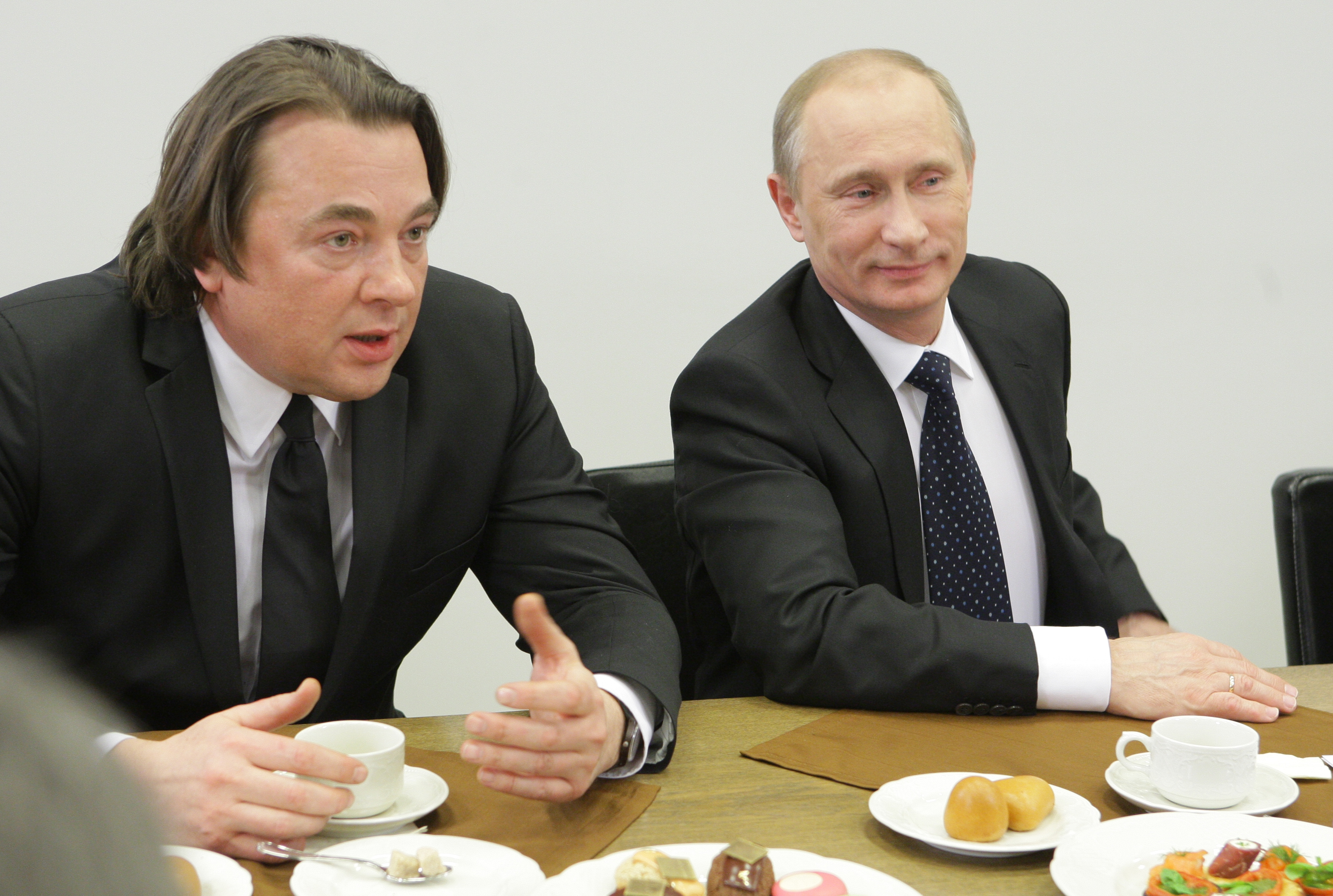
Putin and Konstantin Ernst, chief of Russia's main state-controlled TV station Channel One, considered "Putin's top image maker"

In 2014, Ivan Zassoursky, a professor of media and theory of communications in the Journalism Department of Moscow State University, said, "Today there are many complex schemes of influence in the world that can be labeled as soft power. But traditional thuggish methods of propaganda and direct control used by the Russian government cannot be considered effective from the professional standpoint and acceptable from the viewpoint of journalist morality."

Following Russia's 2014 annexation of Crimea, a significant increase in Russian propaganda was noted by NATO. In February 2017, a fabricated audio recording of NATO Secretary Jens Stoltenberg supposedly interacting with Ukrainian President Petro Poroshenko was published by Russian news website Life.ru. The supposed voice of Poroshenko was revealed to be Russian pranksters. Russia has been comparing Ukrainian government forces in Donbas to members of ISIS. Political scholar Nikolay Kozhanov has claimed that Russia has used propaganda to convey nationalistic as well as pro-Assad messages during the Syrian Civil War. Kozhanov claims that Russia has made an effort through propaganda to paint Russia and Syria as a stable force "in the struggle against instability caused by the Americans and terrorism supported by the US regional partners."

RT and Sputnik news agencies are also spreading false information. In the downing of Malaysia Airlines Flight 17, the Bellingcat website of Eliot Higgins gave evidence about the manipulation of satellite images released by the Russian Ministry of Defense, which was used by RT and Sputnik news agency based in Edinburgh, Scotland.

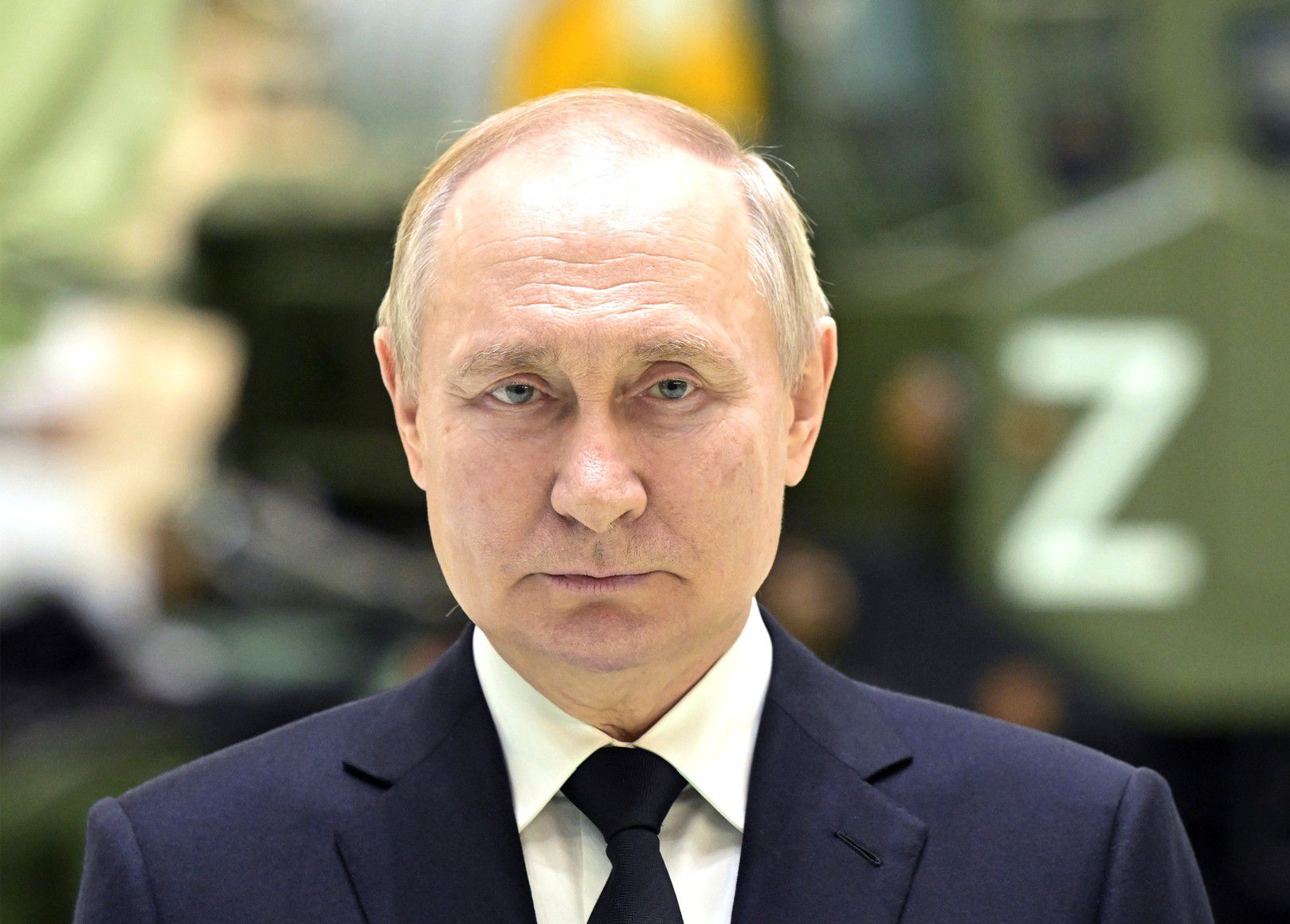
In September 2024, Vladimir Putin claimed that freedom of speech and freedom of the press are fully respected in Russia.

Continuing Russian propaganda led to several people experiencing the denial of their experience of the Russian invasion of Ukraine in 2022, even by family members from the other side of the information iron curtain. Russian state-controlled media systematically downplayed both civilian and military losses, denouncing reports of attacks on civilians as "fake" or blaming Ukrainian forces. Although the 1993 Russian Constitution has an article expressly prohibiting censorship, the Russian censorship apparatus Roskomnadzor ordered the country's media to only employ information from Russian state sources or face fines and blocks, accusing a number of independent media outlets of spreading "unreliable socially significant untrue information" about the shelling of Ukrainian cities by the Russian army and civilian deaths. Dmitry Muratov, the editor-in-chief of the Russian independent newspaper Novaya Gazeta, said, "Everything that's not propaganda is being eliminated."

According to researchers, Russia has intensified international propaganda efforts targeting Africa, the Middle East, the Balkans, and Asia. Increases in Arabic-language pro-Russian propaganda were detected during the Russian invasion of Ukraine, Russia has been accused of amplifying anti-Western post-colonial grievances in Africa through disinformation campaigns. Partly due to Russian efforts, pro-Moscow sentiments and blaming the West for the 2022 Russian invasion of Ukraine have become mainstream in much of Africa.

== Notable Russian propagandists ==
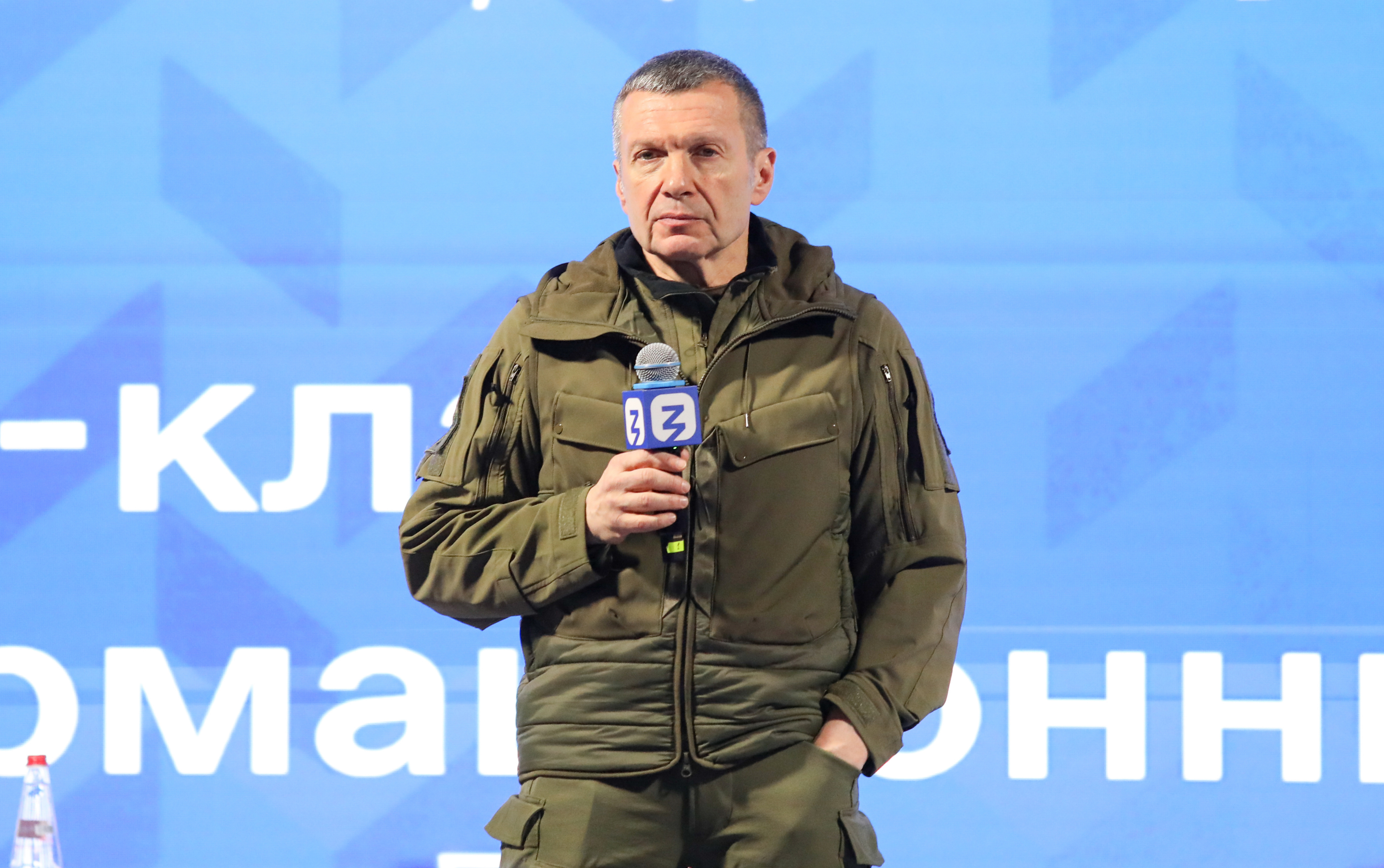
Putin's propagandist Vladimir Solovyov

- Dmitry Kiselyov, TV host and Rossiya Segodnya news agency General Director (under sanctions imposed by Australia)
- Margarita Simonyan, editor-in-chief of RT (formerly Russia Today) and Rossiya Segodnya
- Mikhail Leontyev, Channel One host (under sanctions imposed by Australia)
- Vladimir Solovyov, anchor on the television show Evening with Vladimir Solovyov on Russia-1 (The United Kingdom and the European Union sanctioned Solovyov for inciting violence and undermining Ukraine's sovereignty)
- Olga Skabeyeva, television presenter on All-Russia State Television and Radio Broadcasting Company
- Yevgeny Popov, television presenter on All-Russia State Television and Radio Broadcasting Company
- Dmitry Steshin, war correspondent for the Komsomolskaya Pravda tabloid newspaper (under sanctions imposed by the UK and Australia)
- Alexander Kots, war correspondent for the Komsomolskaya Pravda tabloid newspaper (under sanctions imposed by the UK and Australia)
- Evgeniy Poddubny, special correspondent for Russia-24 and Russia-1 television channels (under sanctions imposed by the UK and Australia)
- Alexander Sladkov, special correspondent for the Izvestia program
- Semyon Pegov, military blogger
- Igor Shchyogolev
- Ekaterina Mizulina
- Svetlana Mironyuk

== Use of social media ==
Russia has been accused of using social media platforms to spread messages of propaganda to a global audience by spreading fake news as well as putting out advertisements and creating pseudo-activist movements. The popularity of Sputnik on social media and its use of viral, clickbait headlines have led it to be described as "the BuzzFeed of propaganda" by Foreign Policy magazine.

Russia was accused by the US authorities for efforts to spread fake news and propaganda in an attempt to meddle in the 2016 US presidential election. Russia is alleged to have used tactics such as creating fraudulent social media accounts and the organization of political rallies and online political advertisements in an effort to help Republican presidential nominee Donald Trump win the election. Senior executives of American social media platforms made an effort to counter alleged Russian propaganda by deleting automated accounts and alerting users of the presence of suspected misinformation on their platforms and that users may have interacted with it. In January 2017, Twitter estimated that approximately 677,000 users had "interacted with Russian propaganda or bots during the 2016 campaign." Three weeks later, Twitter officials said that it is probable that more than 1.4 million users were exposed to content stemming from these accounts. In 2018, Twitter deleted approximately 200,000 tweets that were found to have stemmed from accounts linked to Russia. On 31 October 2017, before the House Intelligence Committee, executives from Facebook, Google, and Twitter testified on Russia's alleged use of social media in the 2016 election. In an effort to combat fake news, Facebook announced a plan in January 2018 to attempt to highlight reliable sources of news.

On 17 May 2017, Deputy Attorney General Rod Rosenstein appointed former FBI Director Robert Mueller to serve as special counsel to the US Justice Department in an investigation into alleged Russian interference in the 2016 election. On 16 February 2018, the US Justice Department indicted thirteen Russian nationals and three Russian companies on charges of attempting to influence the 2016 election in support of the Trump Campaign. Among the organizations indicted was the Internet Research Agency (IRA; active 2013-2023), a St. Petersburg-based company that was said to use social media to spread fake news promoting Russian interests. The indictment claims that employees of the IRA were urged to "use any opportunity to criticize Hillary [Clinton]."

Russia has been accused of engaging in propaganda campaigns in an effort to sway public opinion concerning the nation's annexation of Crimea in 2014. Russian social media operations were allegedly undertaken to use misinformation to appeal to pro-Russian forces in Crimea while discrediting rebel and separatist groups. Notably, a false story was spread throughout social media of a young child being crucified by Ukrainian forces in Slovyansk. The Ukrainian government also banned several Russian internet services, including the popular social media network, VK which has been criticized as being censorship, affecting millions of Ukrainians.

== Propaganda in education ==
Since coming to power in 2000, Putin and his government have promoted the idea of "patriotic education" in educational reforms in order to spread propaganda and increase loyalty to the regime. Putin has insisted that students learn patriotic values in schools that lessons in history, languages and the arts should inspire pride among youth and strengthen their "patriotism." At first, these efforts to bring about educational changes had limited success; however, after the annexation of Crimea in 2014, according to The Washington Post, the "patriotic" reforms and the emphasis on patriotism have grown, while freedom of speech in schools declined, and teachers also became more likely to be fired for publicly expressing political views. The national Russian symbols became more celebrated, and in 2014, the Russian government approved a new set of history textbooks, which featured a revised narrative of historical events and praised Putin's achievements and the annexation of Crimea.

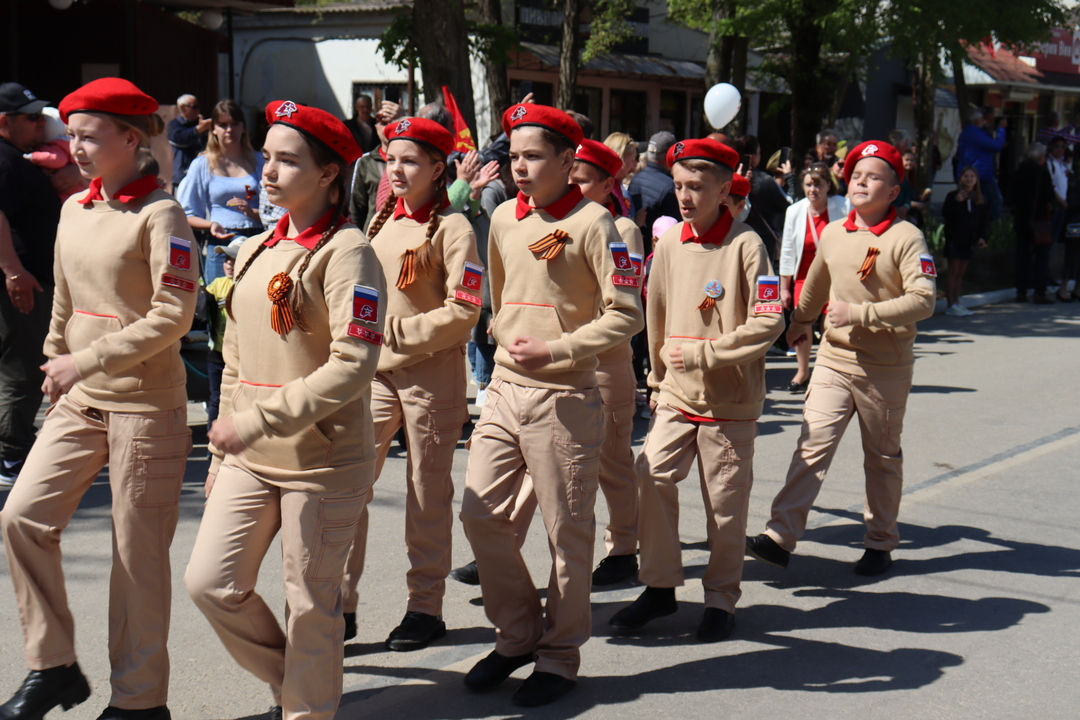
Putin's Young Army in Crimea on 9 May 2022

On 21 May 2020, The Moscow Times reported that Russian President Vladimir Putin made another effort to introduce "patriotic lessons" for Russian students.

Following the Russian invasion of Ukraine in February 2022, the Russian government increased their efforts to introduce "patriotic education" into schools by passing new education laws, revising school textbooks, and introducing teaching guides that help teachers deliver "patriotic" lessons that would justify the invasion.

In September 2022, the Ministry of Education rolled out a series of compulsory lesson plans, developed in large part by Education Minister Sergey Kravtsov, titled Conversations about Important Things (Russian: Разговоры о важном, romanized: Razgovory o vazhnom, lit. 'Conversations about that which is important,' or Important Conversations for short). Important Conversations includes lessons on "patriotism" taught to children beginning at the age of six, such as "the happiness of the motherland is more precious than life," "a true patriot should be ready to defend the country," and "it's not scary to die for the motherland." It also teaches children about Russian heroes such as Soviet cosmonaut Yuri Gagarin and covers various topics from the Russian government's perspective, such as national identity, patriotism, traditional values, and world events. Putin hosted an inaugural lesson with selected students in the Russian exclave of Kaliningrad on 1 September 2022. The Associated Press reported that some parents were shocked by the militaristic nature of Important Conversations lessons, with some comparing them to the "patriotic education" of the former Soviet Union. Some Russian students and their parents have been investigated by the police, or threatened with expulsion, for refusing to attend the Important Conversations lessons.

In the first week of March, Russian schools held an "All-Russia Open Lesson," a virtual lesson to further justify the need to wage war on Ukraine and the "danger" of NATO (see disinformation in the Russian invasion of Ukraine). The Ministry of Education also distributed manuals to teachers, instructing them on how to discuss the war, including an "approved" version of the conflict. One manual explicitly claims Russia's war in Ukraine "is not a war." Russian teachers faced prosecution for expressing anti-war views in and outside the classroom. Putin signed legislation expanding Russia's foreign agent law. Under the expansions, any persons or organizations who receive support of any type, not just financial, are added to a justice ministry list of "foreign agents." "Foreign agents" are barred from receiving state funding, teaching at state universities, or working with children. The Roskomnadzor was given the authority to block "foreign agent" websites at the Justice Ministry's request without need for a court order. In the summer of 2022, Putin approved the creation of a nationwide children's and youth movement modeled after the Soviet pioneer organisations.

In August 2023, a history textbook written by Vladimir Medinsky alleged that after the collapse of the Soviet Union, the "West became fixated with destabilising the situation inside Russia." "The aim was not even hidden: to dismember Russia and to get control over its resources." According to critics, the textbook spreads Kremlin propaganda and the worldview of Vladimir Putin.

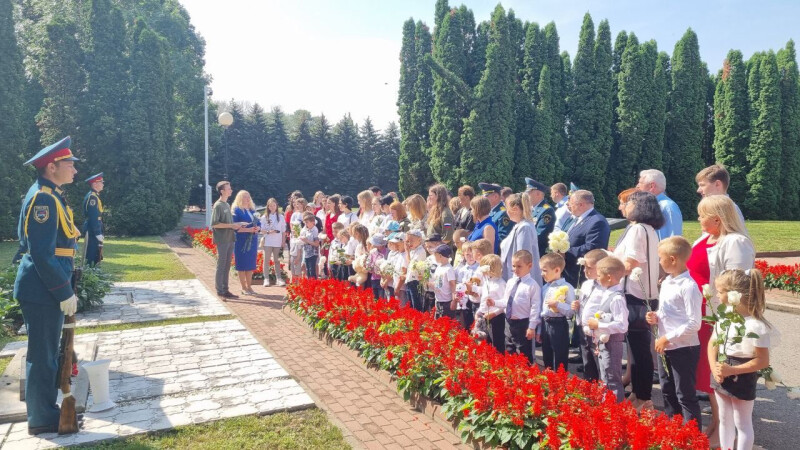
Russian children at a memorial to children allegedly killed by Ukrainian forces in Donbas, a state-sponsored event in Kursk in July 2023

== Reactions ==
Due to the propaganda in the Russian Federation, the European External Action Service founded the East StratCom Task Force in 2015 to count and display cases of untruths propagated in Russia about the EU and its member states.

According to Mykola Riabchuk, Ukrainian journalist and political analyst, the Russian propaganda evolved into a full-fledged information war during the Russo-Ukrainian War. Riabchuk writes, "Three major narratives emerged that can be summed up as 'Ukraine's borders are artificial,' 'Ukraine's society is deeply divided,' and 'Ukrainian institutions are irreparably dysfunctional,'" thus needing "external, apparently Russian, guardianship."

During a hearing in the US Congress in 2015, Leon Aron, director of Russian studies at the American Enterprise Institute, described the Russian-sponsored TV network RT (formerly known as Russia Today) as not only promoting the Russian "brand", but also aiming to "devalue the ideas of democratic transparency and responsibility, undermine the belief in the reliability of public information, and fill the airwaves with half-truths." He described Russian state propaganda as "aggressive, often subtle, and effective in its use of the Internet."

Peter Pomerantsev, a British TV producer, in his 2014 book Nothing Is True and Everything Is Possible, argues that the propaganda's goals are not to convince, as in classical propaganda, but to make an information field "dirty" so people would not trust anyone.

Discussing the Russo-Ukrainian War in 2014, John Kerry, United States Secretary of State, referred to RT as a state-sponsored "propaganda bullhorn" and continued, "Russia Today [sic] network has deployed to promote President Putin's fantasy about what is playing out on the ground. They almost spend full-time devoted to this effort, to propagandize, and to distort what is happening or not happening in Ukraine." Cliff Kincaid, the director of Accuracy in Media's Center for Investigative Journalism, called RT "the well-known disinformation outlet for Russian propaganda."

Members of the European Parliament have argued that Europe needs to strengthen its defense against Russian propaganda, citing alleged Russian meddling in French, German, and Spanish elections as well as Brexit. In March 2015, the East Stratcom Task Force was created with the backing of the European Union in order to counter Russian efforts to spread misinformation and fake news.

On 14 March 2022, Marina Ovsyannikova, an editor for Russia's main state-controlled TV station Channel One, interrupted the television's live broadcast to protest against the Russian invasion of Ukraine, carrying a poster stating in a mix of Russian and English: "Stop the war, don't believe the propaganda; here you are being lied to."

On 5 April 2022, Russia's opposition politician Alexei Navalny said the "monstrosity of lies" in the Russian state media "is unimaginable. And, unfortunately, so is its persuasiveness for those who have no access to alternative information." He tweeted that "warmongers" among Russian state media personalities "should be treated as war criminals. From the editors-in-chief to the talk show hosts to the news editors, [they] should be sanctioned now and tried someday."

== See also ==
- Tankie
- Propaganda in the Soviet Union
- Communist propaganda
- Firehose of falsehood
- Media freedom in Russia
- Russian disinformation
- Russophilia
- Internet Research Agency
- Vatnik
- Fridge vs. TV
