= Russian military bloggers =

In Russia, military bloggers (also called "war bloggers", "milbloggers" or voenkory, "war correspondents") have gained prominence during the 2022 Russian invasion of Ukraine, providing a greater level of information about the war than is available from state media. Blogs range from those affiliated with state media, which often provided information more in-line with that of government positions, to independent and Wagner Group-affiliated blogs which are more critical of the Russian military establishment's performance in Ukraine. These blogs are notable for their ultranationalist and pro-war views but can be critical of the Russian government's prosecution of the war. In 2023, many of these bloggers were active on the messaging app Telegram; however, as of 2026 Telegram has been banned in Russia in what has been seen as an attempt to curtail criticism of the war.

The Institute for the Study of War attributed their popularity to the Russian government's failure to establish an effective social media presence as well as its failure in preparing the Russian public for a drawn-out war. The Russian government has protected them from calls for censorship and has selectively granted positions to nationalist and pro-war milbloggers due to their importance in the ultranationalist constituency which Vladimir Putin's presidency has become increasingly reliant upon. Putin himself has met with prominent milbloggers aligned with state-media to discuss military matters. However, since September 2023, the Russian government arrested a number of high-profile milbloggers, which some have seen as a crackdown on the community.

== Prominent Russian military bloggers ==
- Alexander Kots
- Alexander Sladkov
- Andrey Morozov (Murz) †
- Boris Rozhin
- Evgeniy Poddubny
- Igor Girkin (Strelkov) #
- Mikhail Zvinchuk (Rybar)
- Semyon Pegov (WarGonzo)
- Vladlen Tatarsky †
- Yuri Kotenok
