= Yevgeny Poddubny =

Russian war correspondent and propagandist (born 1983)

- Евгений Поддубный
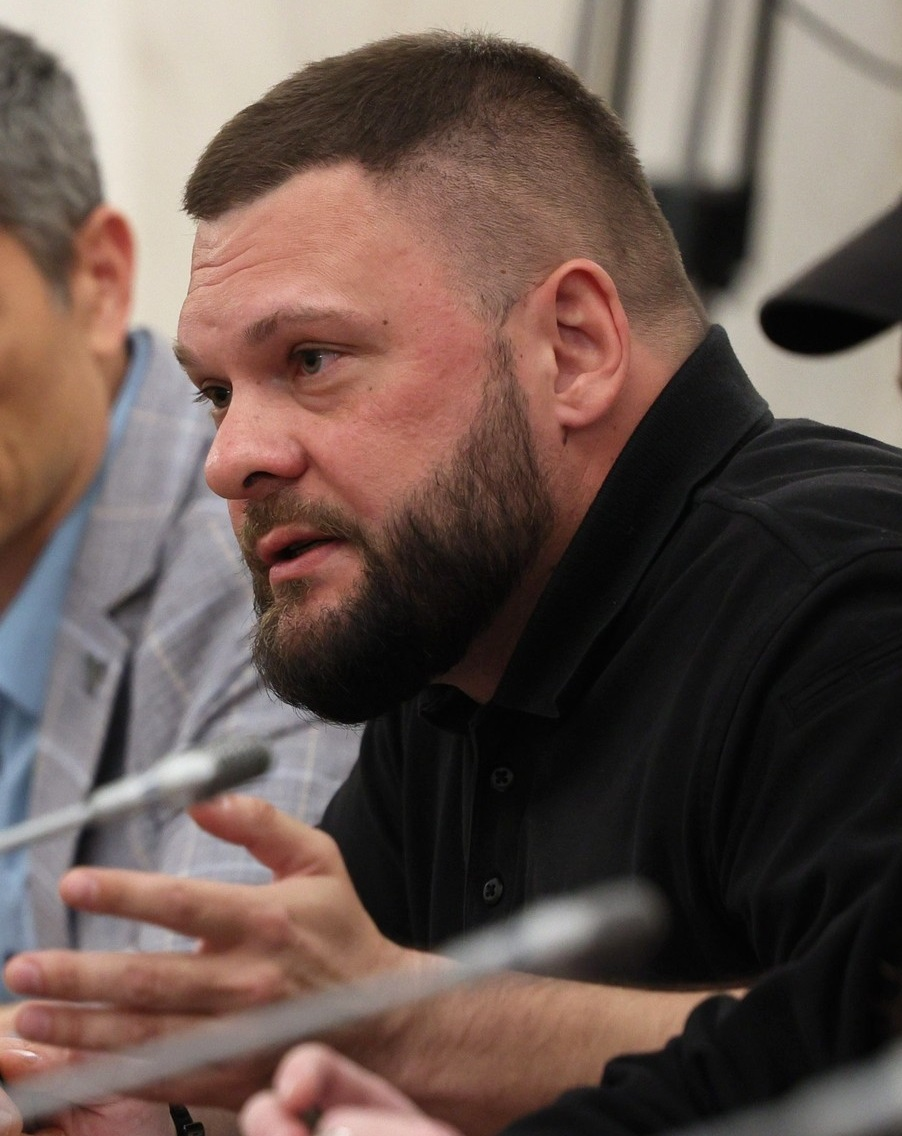
- Poddubny in 2023
- Born: August 22, 1983 (age 43); Belgorod, U.S.S.R.
- Other name: Evgeny Poddubny or Yevgeniy Poddubny
- Education: Belgorod State University
- Occupation: Propagandist
- Years active: 2001–present
- Title: Hero of the Russian Federation (2024)

Yevgeny Yevgenyevich Poddubny (Russian: Евгений Евгеньевич Поддубный; born August 22, 1983) is a Russian war correspondent, and special correspondent for the Russia-24 and Russia-1 television channels, commonly described as Russian propagandist. He was born in Belgorod, and received a master's degree in psychology and has worked as a war correspondent for Russian state television.

In August 2024, he received injuries after his vehicle was struck with a ukrainian loitering munition while covering the August 2024 Kursk Oblast incursion.

He has covered Russian conflicts in Georgia, Syria, as well as in Ukraine. For his work, he has received sanctions by both the United Kingdom, and Australia who accuse him of disinformation and propaganda on behalf of the Russian government.

== Early life ==
Poddubny was born on 22 August 1983, in Belgorod. His father, Yevgeny Pavlovich Poddubny, and mother, Irina Mikhailovna Poddubnaya are surgeons. He received his primary education in 20th secondary school in Belgorod. He graduated from Belgorod State University, with a master's degree in psychology. He speaks English and was studying Arabic.

== Career ==
From 2001 to 2011, he worked as a special correspondent in the Directorate of Information Programs at the "TV Center" channel. Since September 2011, he has been a special correspondent for Russia-24 and Russia-1, covering local conflicts in different countries. He has repeatedly worked in the Russian-occupied territories of Georgia and Ukraine, where he justified war crimes and Russian aggression against those countries.

=== Work in Ukraine ===
Poddubny is frequently described as one of the Kremlin's 'main' / 'lead' propagandists, and his work is frequently cited as 'Kremlin propaganda'.

From early 2014, Evgeny Poddubny, as a special correspondent for the Russia-24 TV channel, has covered the Revolution of Dignity, the Russian annexation of Crimea, and the Russo-Ukrainian War. Poddubny's reporting has consistently aligned with the position of the Kremlin – he calls the invasion of Russian troops in Ukraine a "special operation" and spreads propaganda narratives about Ukraine as a Neo-Nazi state. Denies Russian war crimes against civilians, provides "expert" comments, creates a positive image of the Russian military, and spoil the image of Ukrainian government and the Armed Forces of Ukraine. Security Service of Ukraine declares suspicion to Poddubny for his illegal activity in Ukraine.

In May 2022, thanks to a report by Yevgeny Poddubny and Alexander Kots, the Ukrainian military managed to locate and destroy the Russian military equipment, that had previously destroyed the bridge between the cities of Sievierodonetsk and Lysychansk. On July 9, 2022, the Security Service of Ukraine and the Prosecutor General's Office of Ukraine informed Yevgeny Poddubny that he was suspected of distributing materials in which he justified Russia's aggression against Ukraine and supported the actions of the Russian military.

He has been accused of being 'illegally in Ukraine', and 'justifying Russian war crimes in Ukraine'.

=== Russia ===
On February 23, 2018, Poddubny and war correspondent Alexander Sladkov performed a song together with Joseph Kobzon at a holiday concert in the Kremlin dedicated to the 100th anniversary of the Red Army and Defender of the Fatherland Day.

In 2018, Poddubny served as a confidant of Vladimir Putin as a candidate in the presidential election.

=== Work in Syria ===
As a Russia-24 special correspondent, Poddubny has repeatedly reported from Syria, covering the confrontation between the government and the armed opposition during the civil war in Syria. His reporting has consistently followed the Kremlin narrative. On September 16, 2012, his film "The Battle for Syria" premiered on the Russia-24 TV channel. The film was translated into several European languages. In June 2013, Foreign Ministry of Turkmenistan accused the Russia-1 and Russia-24 TV channels and Poddubny himself of violating elementary standards of journalistic ethics for his report "Syrian Jihad Turns the Opposition into Radicals." The report focused on the fact that one of the Al-Qaeda suicide bombers in Aleppo is coordinated by Ravshan Gazakov, a citizen of Turkmenistan.

On September 12, 2013, the Russia-24 TV channel aired an exclusive interview with the President of the Syrian Arab Republic Bashar al-Assad, which the head of state gave to Yevgeny Poddubny. In the conversation, President Assad stated publicly for the first time that the Syrian Arab Republic is acceding to the Chemical Weapons Convention and transferring arsenals of chemical warfare agents and production facilities for destruction under the supervision of OPCW monitors to international control. As a result of the interview with President Bashar al-Assad, U.S. President Barack Obama renounced his intentions to conduct a large-scale military operation against the SAR.

In April 2018, Poddubny conducted an investigation into the circumstances of the chemical attack in the Syrian city of Douma, which refuted the involvement of Syrian government troops, supporting the Assad government's denials of involvement. However, investigative journalists from The New York Times and Bellingcat found that the Syrian military most likely carried out the chemical attack, dropping a cylinder of chlorine gas from a helicopter.

In April 2021, at the monthly UN Security Council meeting on chemical weapons in Syria, U.S. representative to the UN Linda Thomas-Greenfield stressed that Russia was obstructing efforts to hold the Syrian government accountable.

=== International sanctions ===
On May 4, 2022, the UK imposed sanctions against Poddubny for spreading disinformation and propaganda about the Russian invasion of Ukraine. Russian military propagandists Alexander Kots and Dmitry Steshin were also included in sanctions list. They were banned from entering the UK and their British assets are frozen. On May 18, 2022, Australia imposed sanctions against Yevgeny Poddubny, Alexander Kots, and Dmitry Steshin.

=== Kursk ===
During a Ukrainian cross-border attack he was wounded and sent to a regional hospital in the Kursk Oblast on August 7, 2024, after his car with attacked by a ukrainian loitering munition. A spokesperson for the Russian Ministry of Health confirmed that he was conscious and said that "He is now in intensive care." He was later transported to a hospital in Moscow. The Investigative Committee of Russia has opened an investigation into the attack to determine who is the responsible party for the attack on Poddubny.

== Awards ==
- Medal "Participant of the military operation in Syria" of the Russian Ministry of Defense (2016)
- Medal "Valor and Bravery" of the Investigative Committee of the Russian Federation (2020)
- Order Męstwa (2014)
- Order za zasługi wojskowe (?)
- Medal za odwagę
- Order Bohatera Federacji Rosyjskiej (2024)
- Order za zasługi dla ojczyzny (2017)

== Gallery ==
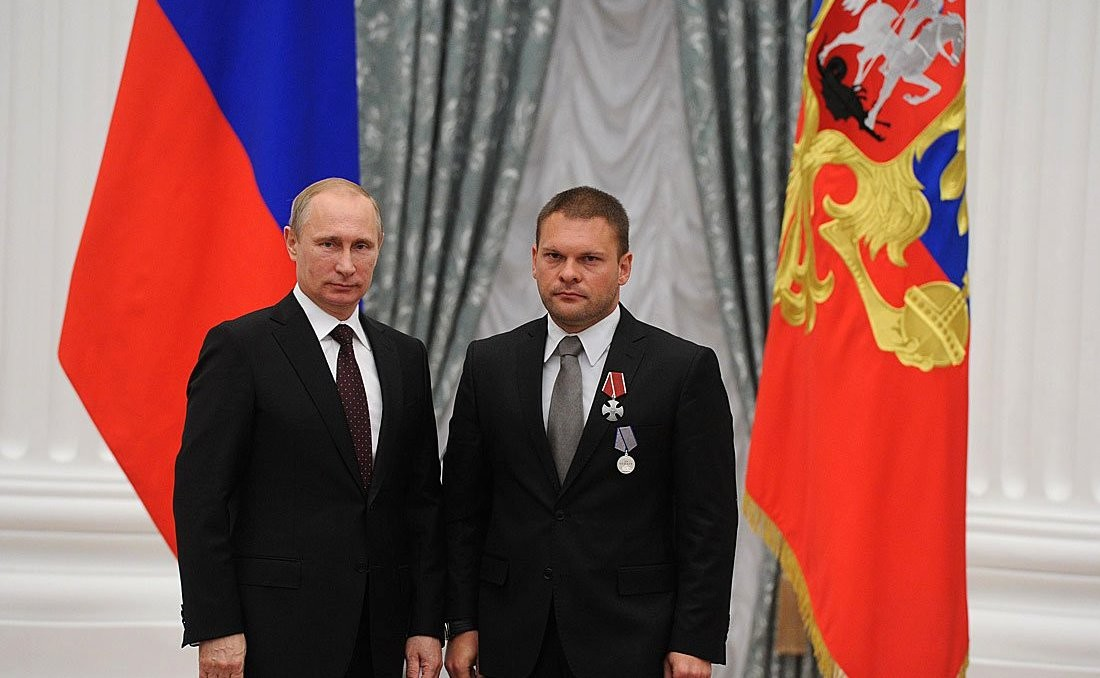
Presentation of the Order of Courage, 31 July 2014

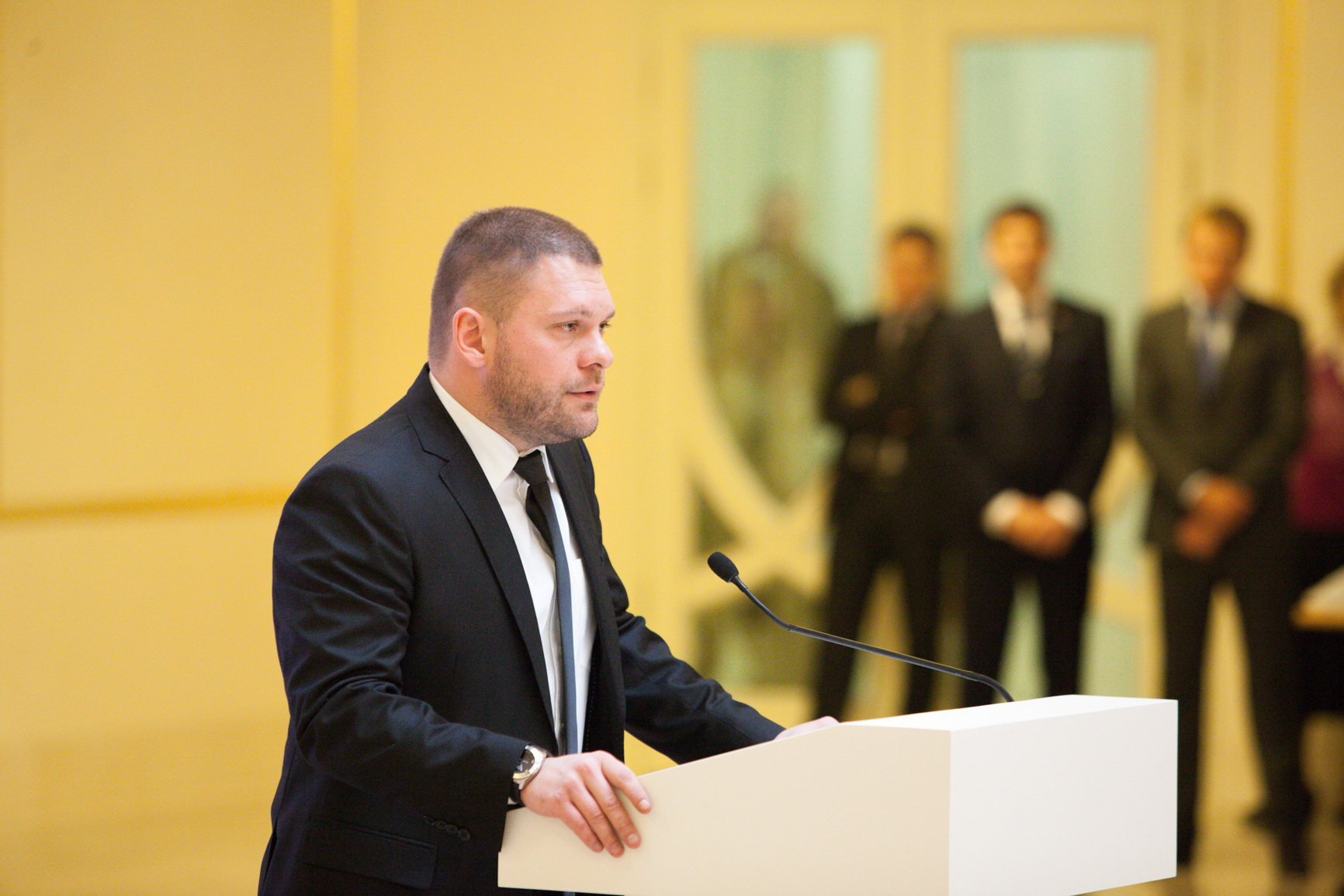
In the Federation Council, 17 November 2014

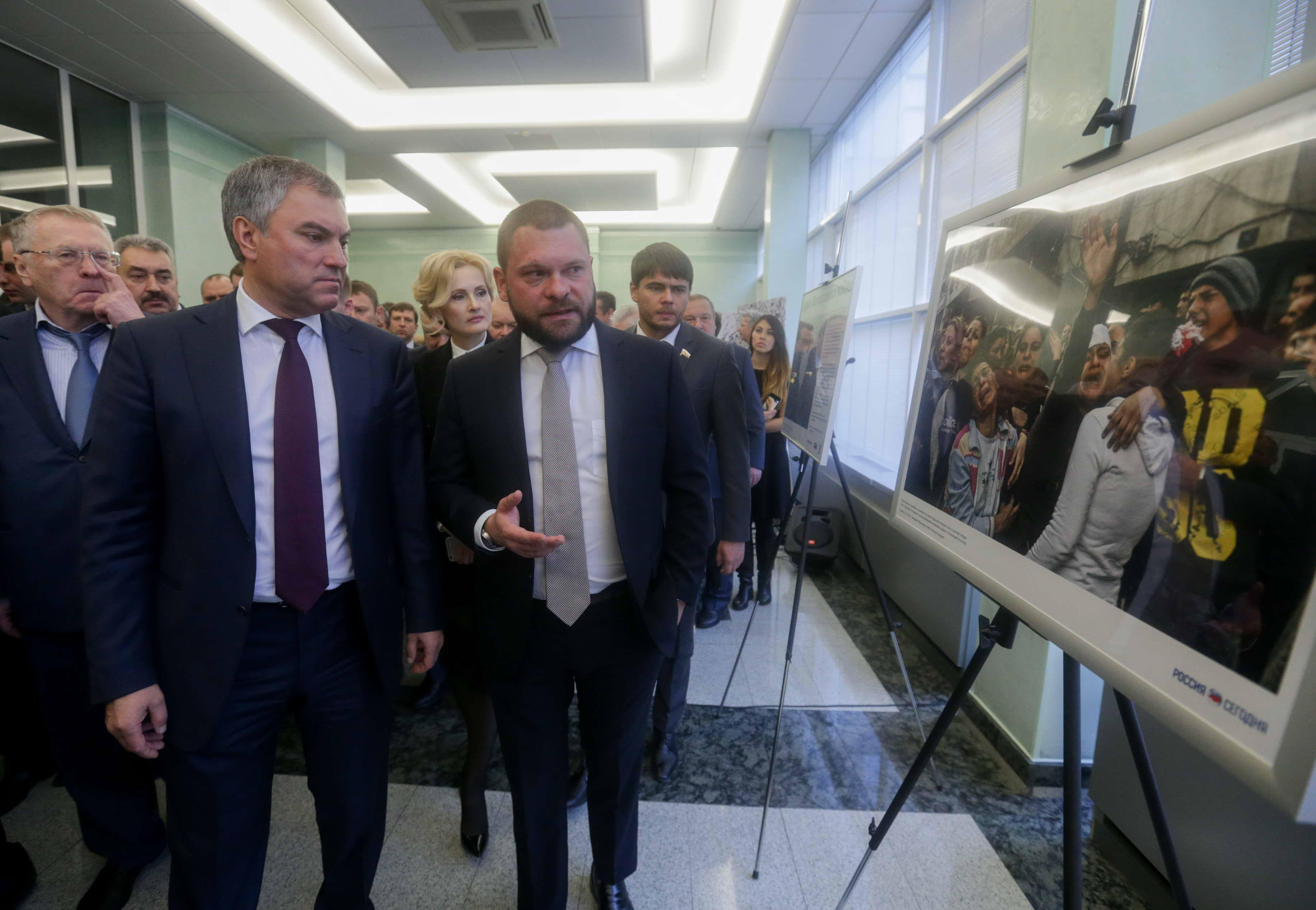
With Vyacheslav Volodin on photoexhibition, 18 January 2017

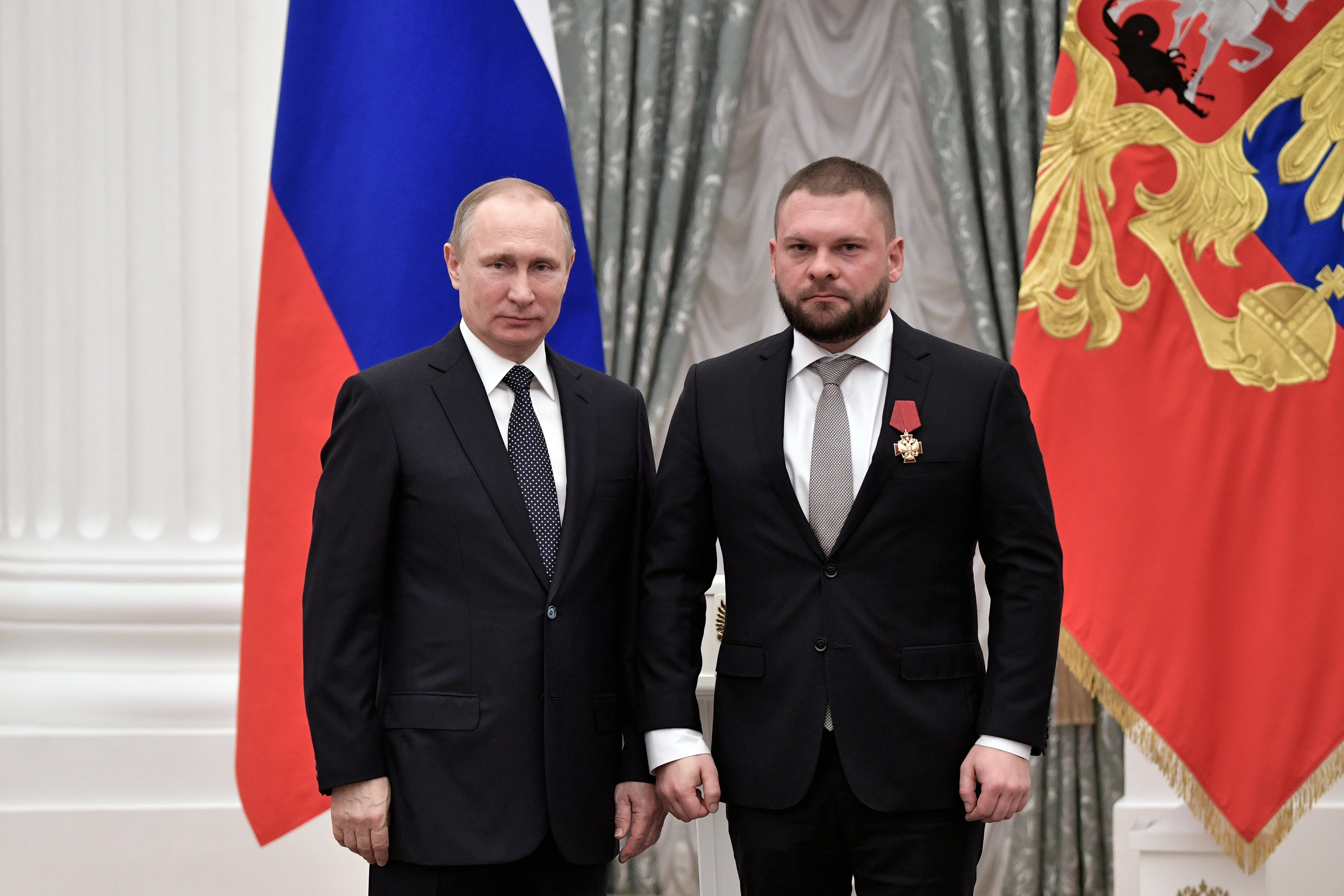
Presentation of the Order "For Merit to the Fatherland", 4th class, 26 January 2017

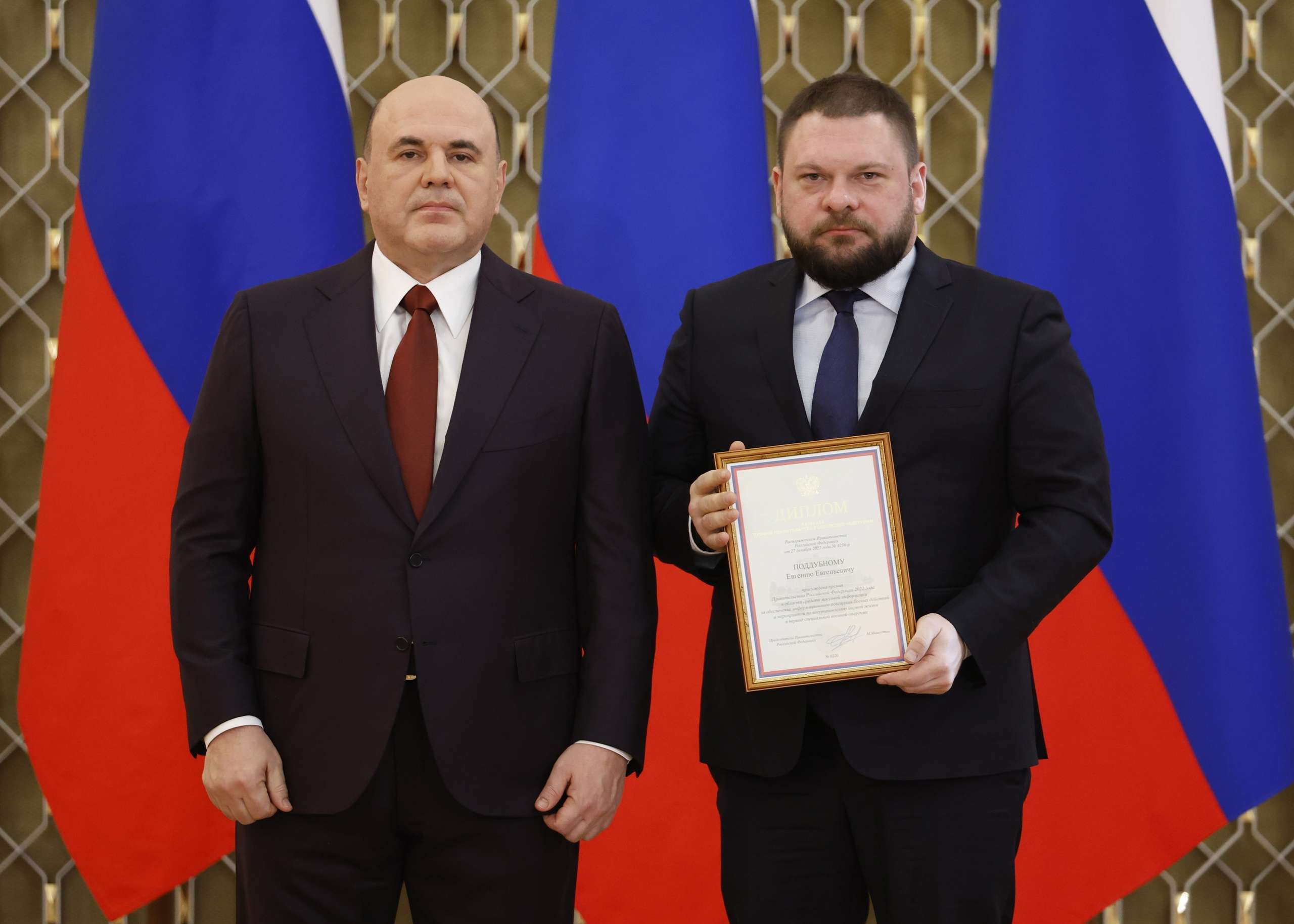
With Mikhail Mishustin, 12 January 2023

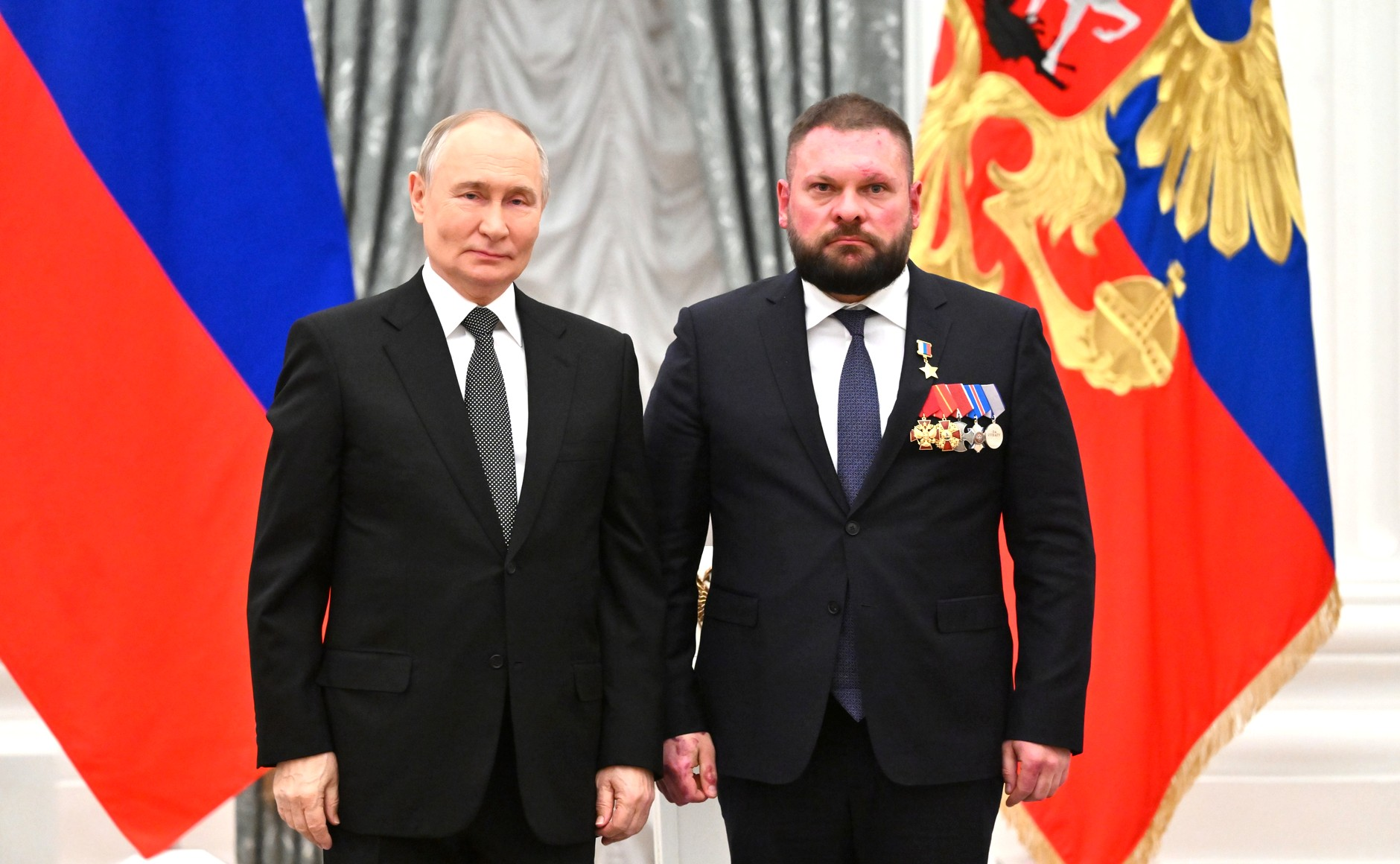
Presentation of the star of Hero of the Russian Federation, 12 December 2024

== See also ==
- Alexander Kots
- Semen Pegov
- Anatoly Shariy
- Alexander Sladkov
- Dmitry Steshin
- Russian information war against Ukraine
