= Ukrainian Commission for Regulation of Gambling and Lotteries =

Ukrainian state regulator

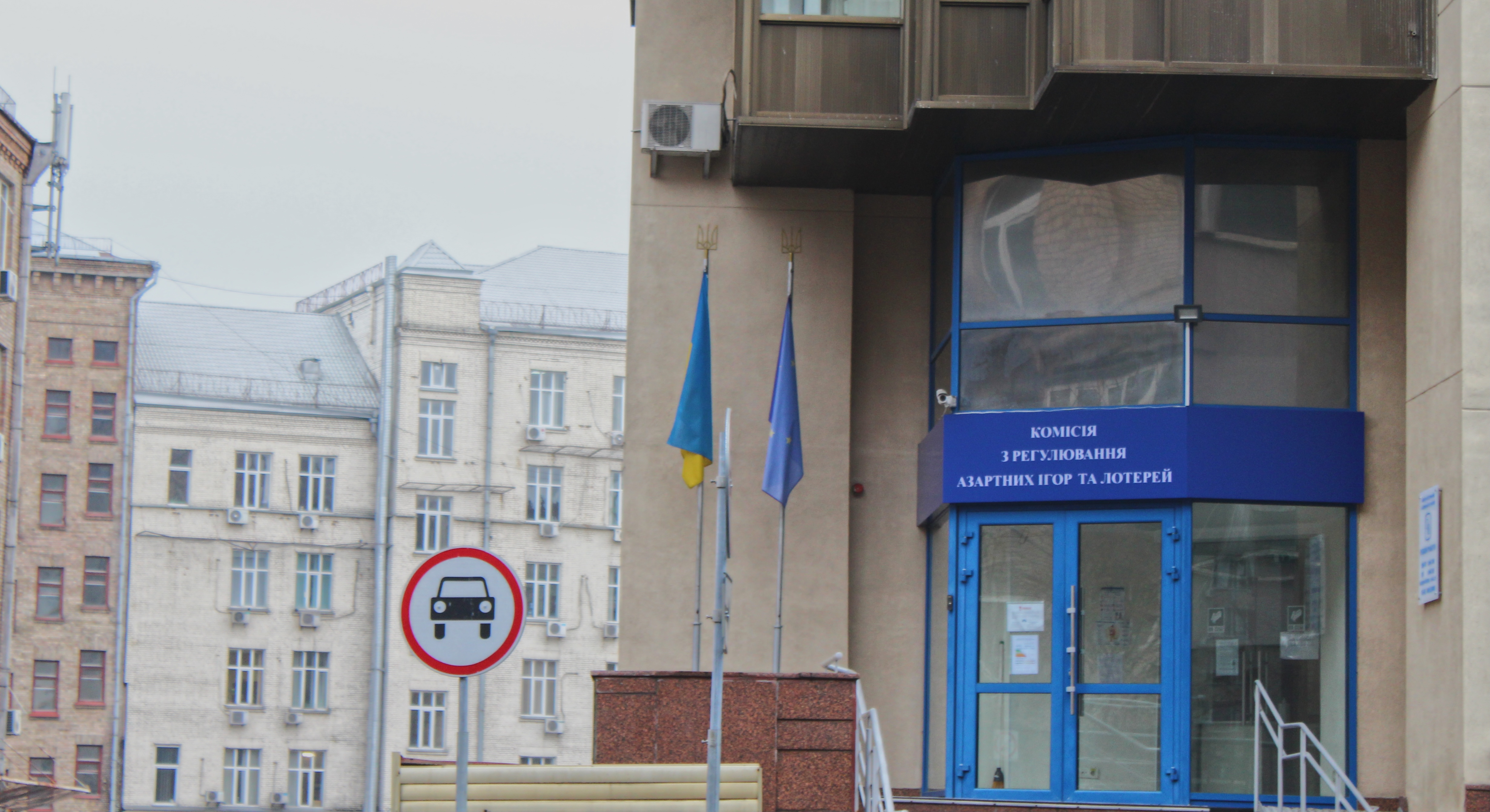
- Head office

Agency overview
- Formed: 23 September 2020
- Jurisdiction: Government of Ukraine
- Employees: 300+
- Agency executive: Ivan Rudyi

The Commission for Regulation on Gambling and Lotteries is a Ukrainian state regulator that deals with licensing and regulation of gambling in Ukraine. The commission was established on September 23, 2020. It is located in Kyiv on Lesia Ukrainka Boulevard, 26. The first gambling licenses were released in February 2021.

== Description ==
On July 14, 2020, the Verkhovna Rada adopted the Law “On State Regulation of Activities on the Organization and Conduct of Gambling” (Law No. 768-IX), which provided for the establishment of a regulatory commission. Boris Baum, a former top manager of the Russian company VS Energy and the Premier hotel chain, drafted the bill. UGLC licenses 5 types of gambling: land-based casinos, online casinos, offline and online bookmakers, slot machines, online poker and lotteries.

On August 11, 2020, 11 types of gambling were legalized in Ukraine. The law allowed all types of gambling, except for lotteries, which are not described in the law adopted in June 2009.

On October 22, 2020, Ivan Rudyi, a Ukrainian soldier, ATO veteran and captain of the Ukrainian national team at the Invictus Games, was appointed the first head of the commission for a term of 4 years. Recruitment of 230 commission members and six regional directors was also announced.

The commission is a state body for control over all licensed activities of casino operators. This is the first such body in the history of Ukraine, which will oversee the legality of the gambling business.

In February 2021, the commission gave first two licenses Slots City owned by Dutch gambling holding Storm International and Cosmolot, owned by Ukrainian gambling company.

In August 2021, The National Anti-Corruption Bureau of Ukraine detained Yevhen Hetman, a member of the Commission for Regulation of Gambling and Lotteries, for receiving illegal benefits.
