= Sladkov =

Sladkov (masculine, Russian: Сладков) or Sladkova (feminine, Russian: Сладкова) is a Russian surname. Notable people with the surname include:

- Alexander Sladkov (born 1966), Russian military correspondent
- Nicole Sladkov (born 1999), American group rhythmic gymnast
- Yevgeniy Sladkov (born 1983), Kazakh road bicycle racer
