= Dmitry Steshin =

Russian journalist (born 1972)

- Дмитрий Стешин
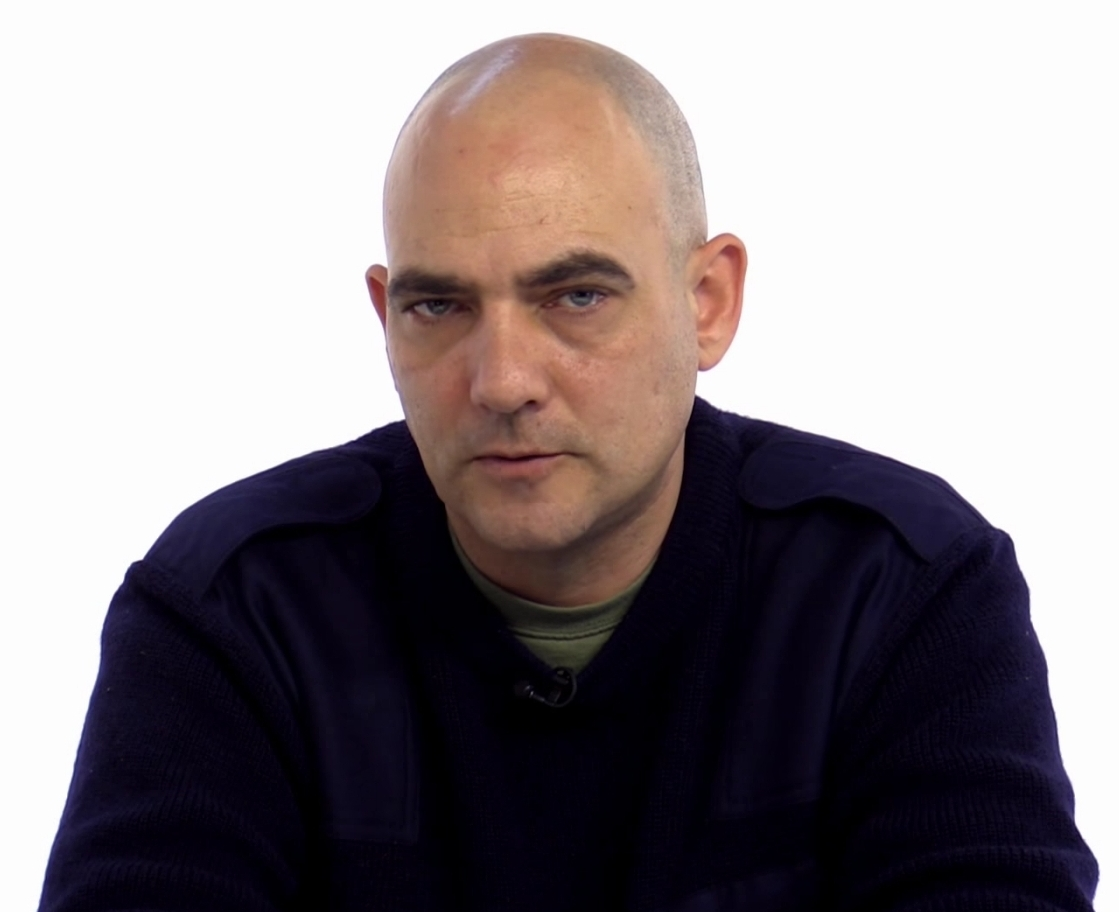
- Steshin in 2014
- Born: September 12, 1972 (age 53); Leningrad, Russian SFSR, Soviet Union
- Education: North-West Academy of Public Administration
- Occupation: Journalist
- Years active: 1994–present
- Employer: Komsomolskaya Pravda
- Awards: Order "For Merit to the Fatherland" (2nd class); Medal "For the Return of Crimea"

Dmitry Anatolyevich Steshin (Russian: Дмитрий Анатольевич Стешин; born 12 September 1972) is a Russian journalist and editor who works for the Komsomolskaya Pravda newspaper and for his own Telegram channel.

== Early life and career ==
Steshin was born in Leningrad (Saint-Petersburg) on September 12, 1972. He graduated from the North-West Academy of Public Administration.

He began his career in the early 1990s at the newspaper Five Corners before working as an editor of the Kaleidoscope from 1994. He then moved to the newspaper Komsomolskaya Pravda in May 2000, becoming St. Petersburg editor-in-chief from 2001 to 2003. In 2004, he relocated to Moscow to work at the head office of the newspaper, which enabled him to work and become friends with fellow journalist Alexander Kots.

== Work as a military reporter ==
Since moving to Moscow in 2004, Steshin has covered revolutions in Kyrgyzstan, Mongolia and Moldova and worked on expeditions in the Far North - Franz Josef Land, Severnaya Zemlya, Middendorf Land and the North Pole. Together with Kots, he prepared material for the 20th anniversary of the accident at the Chernobyl nuclear power plant.

=== Beslan ===
On September 3, 2004, Steshin worked with Russian special services to assist with the evacuation of children held hostage in the Beslan school siege.

=== Middle East ===
During early 2011, Steshin worked in Egypt, Tunisia, and Libya reporting on the Arab Spring before being captured alongside Kots and three journalists from the Russian NTV channel in April while covering the war in Libya. The reporters were accused of being intelligence agents working for Muammar Gaddafi's regime and were released with the help of the Italian military stationed at the Benghazi airfield.

Following his reporting from Syria in 2016, Steshin was awarded by the Russian Minister of Defence with the Medal of Participant in the Syrian civil war in April 2016.

=== Ukraine ===
Steshin covered the annexation of Crimea by the Russian Federation in early 2014 and was awarded the medal "For the Return of Crimea" for his work and on April 21, 2014, he was also awarded the Order "For Merit to the Fatherland" of the second degree for "objective coverage of events in Crimea" which was presented to him by Vladimir Putin. Steshin has provided reporting on the continued hostilities in Ukraine including working in Slovyansk with Kots from December 2013 to May 2014.

Since the start of the 2022 Russian invasion of Ukraine, Steshin has been involved in media coverage of the ongoing battles. However, he has been accused of using biased and one-sided information including posting a report from the Kramatorsk railway station after it was struck by a Russian missile, killing 57, in which he claimed the station was filled with Ukrainian militants, rather than civilians. Writing on Telegram, he said: “Ten minutes ago, this happened at the Kramatorsk railway station. A group of militants of the armed forces of Ukraine was working here,” which was later shown by Bellingcat to be incorrect.

Stechin usually wears a military uniform with no 'Press' markings and has been banned from entering the Ukrainian territory of the country by the Security Service of Ukraine "due to violation of the law on the status of foreigners and stateless persons". In May 2022, he was sanctioned by Great Britain and Australia.

=== Link to nationalists ===
In 2011, Steshin was a witness in the murder case of lawyer Stanislav Markelov and journalist Anastasia Baburova, because he once worked for the same newspaper Novaya Gazeta, and was in contact with the killer, Nikita Tikhonov, a far-right Russian nationalist from the criminal group BORN (Battle Organization of Russian Nationalists, Russian: БОРН) who recruited Steshin to work for the magazine Russian Image and hid in Steshin's apartment in 2006 when he was wanted in connection with the murder of anti-fascist Alexander Ryukhin. Steshin and Tikhonov went camping together and lived for weeks in the same tent and Tikhonov testified that it was Steshin who put him in touch with the sellers of the weapons with which the crime was committed.

Steshin also had close relations with nationalist Ilya Goryachev, leader of the group BORN "Russian Image" who was the godfather of Steshin's son. Steshin later appeared as a witness in court in Goryachev's trial.

Serker Yakubkhanov, a journalist for the newspaper Current Time(Russian language subdomain of US-funded Radio Free Europe), has stated that there were nationalist and xenophobic motives in Steshin's materials about the Caucasus and Steshin has suggested entering nationality in the passport of every citizen.

Steshin supports Russian irredentist aspirations in Northern Kazakhstan.

== See also ==
- Semen Pegov
- Evgeniy Poddubny
- Anatoly Shariy
- Alexander Sladkov
