= Love Against Homosexuality =

Ukrainian civil society movement

Love Against Homosexuality (Ukrainian: Любов проти гомосексуалізму, Liubov proty homoseksualizmu) is a Ukrainian civil society movement that claims to protect traditional family, freedom of speech, and freedom of religion, and oppose propaganda of homosexuality. It was founded in 2003.

== Position ==
In its manifesto the organization stated that sexual minorities want to establish a totalitarian regime that would stifle any dissenting thought, that it is necessary to talk about the discrimination of heterosexuals, and that "all dissidents who call homosexuality a sin, amoral behaviour, and perversion are being persecuted, laughed out, penalized, exposed to accusations of "intolerance". Further, the manifesto claims that homosexuality is a parasite because it may exist only due to heterosexuals' procreation, that it hates family, and that homosexuality and family are antonyms, and therefore they work for the legalization of gay marriage in order to erode the concept of family.

Blogger Anatoly Shariy, who was a member of the Organizing Committee of the movement, stated: "The danger is that sometimes skinheads want to join the movement, [our] movement has nothing to do with that... They [homosexual people] should sit and be happy that they are not getting killed. (...) From their side should be respect; on my part, there is nothing to respect them for, [they are] sick people." According to Shariy, the ultimate goal of Love Against Homosexuality is the following: "... homosexual people stay in their apartments and won't come out to streets, to mass media, and won't propagate their life style" and "we demand criminal liability for propaganda of homosexualism".

== Activities ==
Since 2003, the movement has organized regular demonstrations in Kyiv, typically under banners such as "Homosexuality is AIDS", or "Homosexuality is sin", or "Ukraine is a Christian country". In 2014, the movement appealed to mayor Vitali Klitschko and President Petro Poroshenko with the demand to forbid the Kyiv Gay Pride as an amoral event taking place during the civil strife. On 18 June 2017, again, a protest against the Gay Pride was organized.

On 4 April 2018, thousands of protestors gathered in the government quarter under banners such as "The Initiators of the anti-family initiatives to be prosecuted". The main demands included: to exclude from the "National strategy in the field of human rights in the period up to 2020" provisions that were directed at legalization of same-sex partnerships; to maintain in the Constitution of Ukraine the article that defines "marriage" as exclusively between man and woman; to exclude from the labour code definitions "sexual orientations" and "gender identity" as "ideological" and "anti-scientific"; to pass a law on forbidding the "propaganda of homosexuality" in Ukraine.
