= Fridge vs. TV =

Russian political catchphrase

In discussions of the politics of Russia, the expressions "battle of the fridge vs. TV" (битва холодильника с телевизором), "refrigerator and TV set", etc., refer to the relative influence of the actual living conditions ("what's in the fridge") and state propaganda ("what's on TV") on the opinions of the ordinary population of Russia.

In mid-2010s some commentators suggested that propaganda was prevailing. For example, polls in 2015 suggested that although a majority of Russians agreed that the country was in crisis, the responsibility was often attributed to the West, rather than the Russian government. The expression was among the entries for the 2015 Russian Word of the Year.

The situation began to change around the 2021 Russian protests. Alexandra Ma of Business Insider suggested that the very existence of the witticism may indicates that the grip of state propaganda is incomplete.
