= Semyon Pegov =

Russian journalist (born 1985)

- Семён Пегов
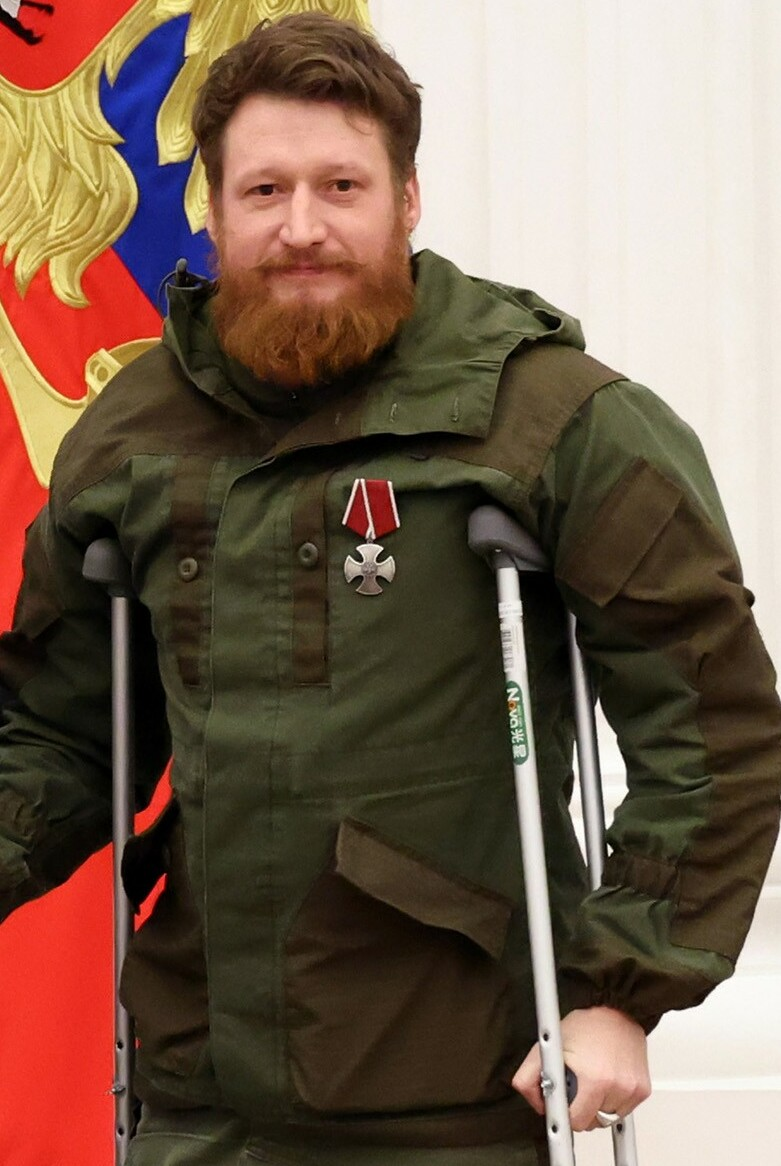
- Pegov in 2022
- Born: September 9, 1985 (age 41); Smolensk, U.S.S.R.
- Education: Smolensk State University
- Occupations: Milblogger, Propagandist
- Years active: 2005–Present
- Awards: Order "For Merit to the Fatherland"; Order of Courage

Semyon Vladimirovich Pegov (Russian: Семён Владимирович Пегов; born 9 September 1985) is a Russian military blogger and propagandist. He works for the military project WarGonzo and a Telegram channel which has been associated with the Russian special services. He has covered the Russo-Ukrainian War, Nagorno-Karabakh conflict, and Russo-Georgian War, primarily from a pro-Russian point of view.

== Biography ==
Pegov was born in Smolensk on September 9, 1985, and graduated from the faculty of philology at Smolensk State University. Pegov initially worked as a TV journalist for VGTRK in Smolensk from 2006 to 2008. In 2008, during the Russo-Georgian War, he was sent to occupied Abkhazia to work for a local TV channel. In 2014, during the Russo-Ukrainian War, he worked as a correspondent for the Kremlin-linked LifeNews channel. In 2017, after the closure of the site, Semyon Pegov headed WarGonzo, owned by Aram Gabrelianov.

Allegedly, Pegov was among 300 media workers who were secretly awarded in 2014 with the Medal of the Order "For Merit to the Fatherland" "for objective coverage of events in Crimea".

=== Belarus ===
In August 2020, Belarusian police detained Pegov during a protest held by supporters of presidential candidate Sviatlana Tsikhanouskaya in Minsk. Thanks to the intervention of the Russian Foreign Ministry and journalist associations, Pegov was released. This was reported by the Russian Ambassador to Belarus Dmitry Mezentsev.

=== Nagorno-Karabakh ===
In September 2020 Pegov went to the Nagorno-Karabakh conflict zone to cover the conflict, mostly with pro-separatist narratives.

On October 12, 2020, the General Prosecutor's Office of Azerbaijan initiated a criminal case against Semyon Pegov after an analysis of several of his videos with calls to break the territorial integrity of the country. He was also accused of violating the laws "On the State Border of the Republic of Azerbaijan" and the Migration Code of the Republic of Azerbaijan by entering Nagorno-Karabakh without official permission.

In December 2021, Semyon Pegov was detained by Moldovan special services at the airport in Chișinău during his flight to Moscow and released after a search and interrogation.

In January 2022, Pegov's book titled "Me and the Redheaded Separ" was published in honor of the Russian Donetsk People's Republic militant Arsen "Motorola" Pavlov known for torturing and murdering Ukrainian POWs, who was killed by Security Service of Ukraine officers in October 2016. The book was presented in Russian-occupied Donetsk.

=== Ukraine ===
In January 2022, according to StopFake.org, Pegov spread a false message on his Telegram channel WarGonzo in which he claimed that the Ukrainian authorities were arming territorial defense units to be sent to Donbas to kill civilians. Most Russian media outlets subsequently published his message. On February 18, 2022, he published a video about an alleged attack by Ukrainian special services on one of the leaders of pro-Russian Donetsk People's Republic" terrorists in Donetsk with a booby-trapped car. Later, the news about this attack was used as one of the reasons for Russia's military invasion of Ukraine.

In April 2022, Pegov posted on his Telegram channel WarGonzo pictures of people mobilized into the Russian army from the occupied territories of Ukraine, whom Russia had armed with weapons from World War II. At the same time, he claimed that these weapons would now be used against the "new Nazis", whom he considers Ukrainians.

In the spring and summer of 2022, Pegov published a number of staged or fake pictures aimed at advancing the Russian narrative of the war in Ukraine. In April 2022, Pegov distributed photos of dead Ukrainian soldiers on his Telegram channel with the message that the Russian military killed saboteurs of the Azov Regiment. Subsequently, experts analyzing the photos concluded that the Ukrainian soldiers were executed by gunshots to the head, and the photos were used for an information war against Ukraine. In May 2022, Pegov published a staged story about the alleged destruction of a Ukrainian UAV. He forgot to cut out the beginning of the video, which shows the Russian air defense system firing into the sky solely for filming. From the first seconds of the video, Pegov prepares to record and then gives the military a command to start shooting. Sitting idle the entire time, the Russian soldier picks up an anti-aircraft gun and begins firing into the sky. On May 6, 2022, according to StopFake.org, he published a false video about the alleged discovery of a secret bio-lab in Mariupol, where NATO supposedly conducted bacteriological research. In July 2022, Pegov claimed on one of the central Russian channels that the Turkish and U.S. governments were supplying ISIS fighters to Ukraine, allegedly involved in many local conflicts in Libya, Syria, and Karabakh. At the same time, Pegov swore that he saw a flag of the terrorist group Al-Qaeda next to the Azov Regiment's flags in Mariupol. On July 6, 2022, Pegov published a false video in which he claimed that the Ukrainian army was using internationally banned methods of warfare and shelling territories with phosphorus munitions.

In March 2022, Ukraine blocked the WarGonzo YouTube channel due to the spread of misinformation. On May 28, 2022, Radio Free Europe/Radio Liberty stated that some of his publications were staged or fake news. In May, YouTube deleted the WarGonzo channel from its site, citing a violation of its policies. Pegov has continued reporting using his other platforms.

On September 2, 2022, Pegov was arrested for, according to WarGonzo, drunkenly threatening a hotel administrator. He was later released. The Institute for the Study of War reported that the Russian government may be stepping up its campaign to promote self-censorship among Russian military bloggers, and that the arrest could be aimed at reducing negative coverage of the course of the war in Ukraine.

On October 23, 2022, it was reported that Pegov was wounded near Donetsk, apparently by a petal anti-personnel mine. Pegov was subsequently awarded the Order of Courage by President Putin.

On June 13, 2023, Pegov was reportedly among a selection of war correspondents and bloggers meeting President Putin in the Kremlin on the topic of Ukraine.

On June 19, 2023, Pegov's Twitter account asserted that he was alive and well contradicting alleged fake reports from Ukrainian media.

== See also ==
- Alexander Kots
- Anatoliy Shariy
- Alexander Sladkov
- Dmitry Steshin
- Russian information war against Ukraine
