= Komsomolskaya Pravda =

Russian daily newspaper

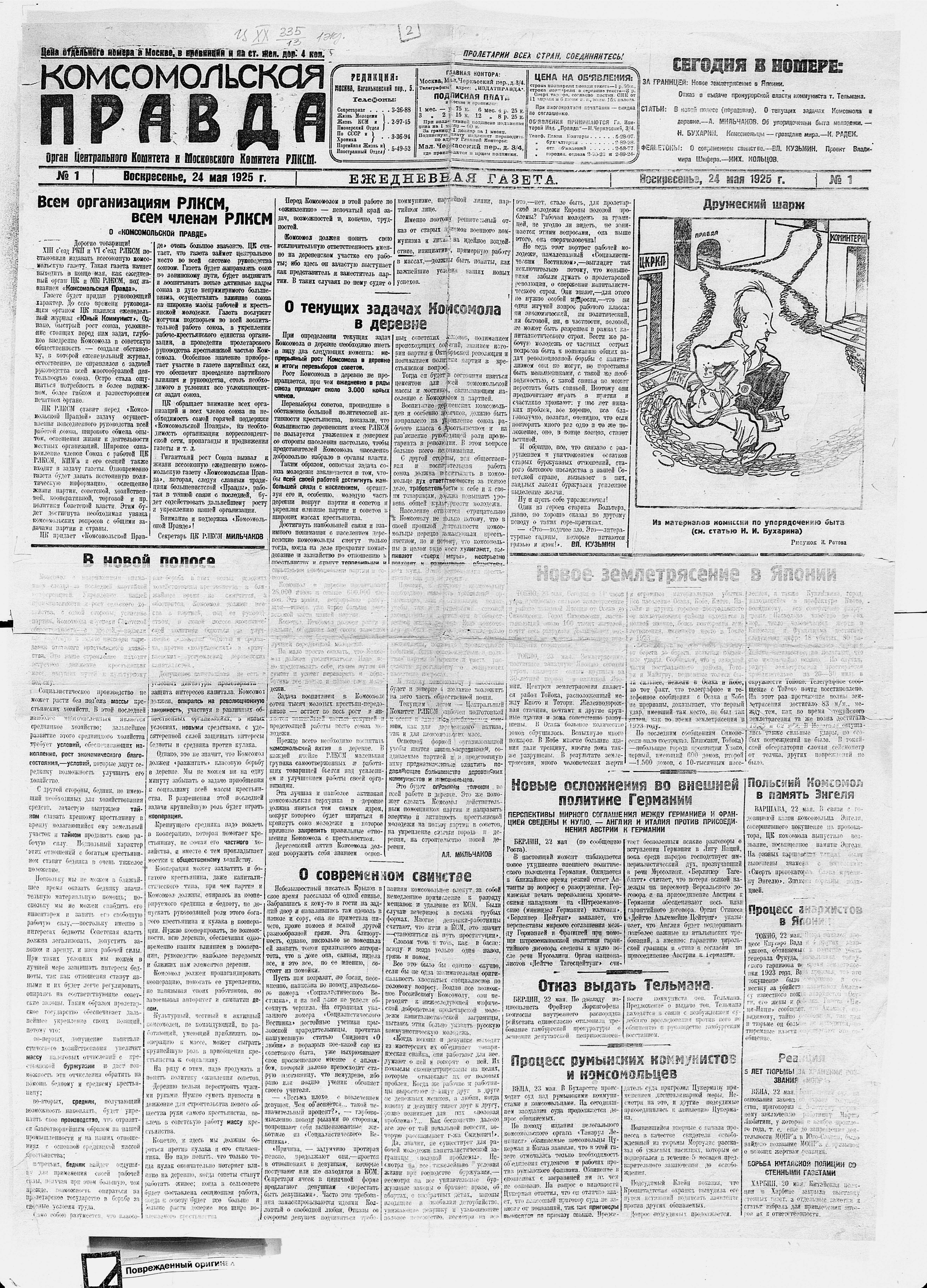
- First issue on 24 May 1925
- Type: Daily newspaper
- Format: Tabloid
- Owner: National Media Group
- Publisher: Izdatelsky Dom Komsomolskaya Pravda
- Editor-in-chief: Olesya Nosova^{d}
- Founded: 24 May 1925; 101 years ago
- Language: Russian
- Headquarters: Moscow, Stary Petrovsko-Razumovsky Proezd 1/23, Building 1
- Country: Soviet Union (1925–1991); Russia (1991–present)
- Circulation: 660,000 (March 2008)
- ISSN: 0233-433X
- Website: www.kp.ru

Komsomolskaya Pravda (Russian: Комсомольская правда; lit. 'Komsomol Truth') is a daily Russian tabloid newspaper that was founded in 1925. Its name is in reference to the official Soviet newspaper Pravda (English: 'Truth').

== History and profile ==
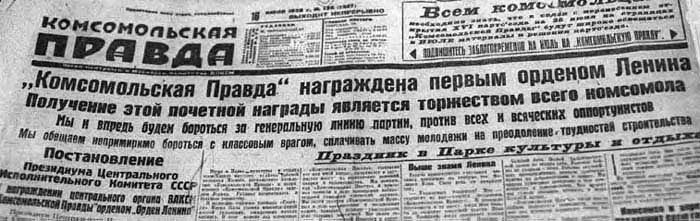
The issue of 23 May 1930

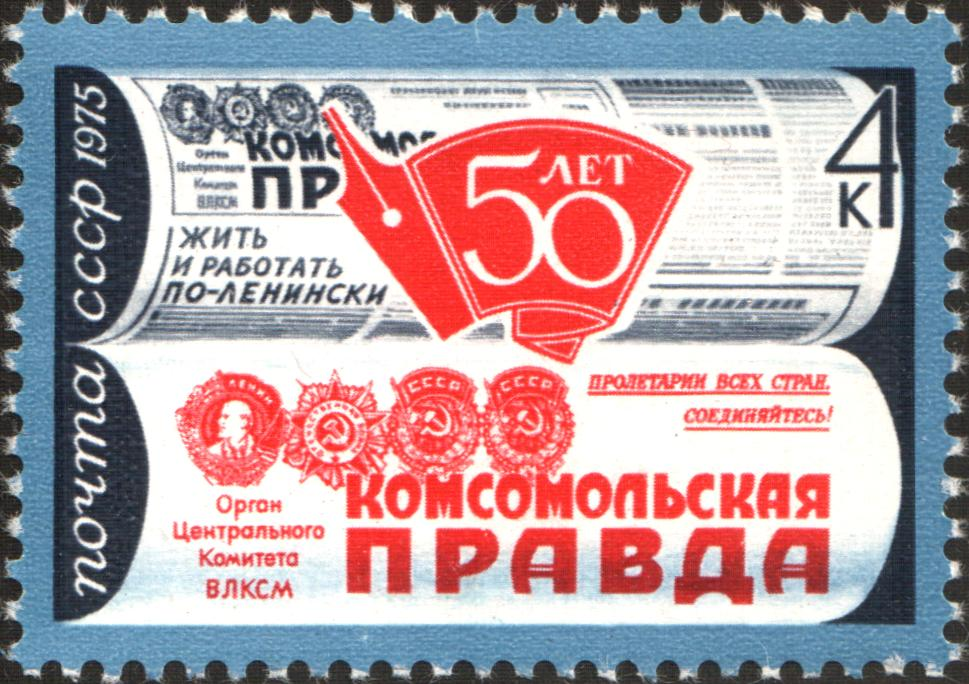
USSR postage stamp commemorating 50 years of Komsomolskaya Pravda

During the Soviet era, Komsomolskaya Pravda was an all-union newspaper of the Soviet Union and an official organ of the Central Committee of the Komsomol. Established in accordance with a decision of the 13th Congress of the Russian Communist Party (b), it first appeared on 24 May 1925 in an edition of 31,000 copies.

Komsomolskaya Pravda began as the official organ of the Komsomol, the youth wing of the Communist Party of the Soviet Union (CPSU). As such, it targeted the same 14 to 28 demographics as its parent organization, focusing initially on popular science and adventure articles while teaching the values of the CPSU. During this period, it was twice awarded the Order of Red Banner of Labour (in 1950 and 1957) and was also the recipient of the Order of Lenin (in 1930), of the Order of the October Revolution (in 1975), and of the Order of the Patriotic War (in 1945).

The paper's largest owner is the son of the founder of the Baltic Media Group, Sergei Rudnov, who indirectly controls 45%. Until 2011, it was owned by Media Partner, which in turn was owned by ESN Group (Евросевернефть), an energy company led by Grigory Berezkin. In December 2000 the Norwegian media company A-Pressen bought 25 percent plus one share of the paper. It is published in tabloid format by "Izdatelsky Dom Komsomolskaya Pravda" (Komsomolskaya Pravda Publishing House).

Komsomolskaya Pravda reached its highest circulation in 1990 when it sold almost 22 million daily copies. According to the European Commission, Komsomolskaya Pravda has also been described as Russian president Vladimir Putin's favourite newspaper. In 2001, it was the ninth-top European newspaper with a circulation of 785,000 copies. It was the top-selling newspaper in Russia in 2006 with daily circulation ranging from 700,000 to 3.1 million copies. Its March 2008 circulation, certified by the NCS, was 660,000 copies and it was the most read paper in the country based on the findings by the TNS Gallup Media. In the same year the online version of the paper was also the most visited news website.

In January 2015 a front-page article in Komsomolskaya Pravda suggested that the United States had orchestrated the Charlie Hebdo shooting.

In May 2017, columnist Alisa Titko went viral for writing that the English city of Manchester was "full of fat people" and that she found the sight of same-sex love "disgusting".

In 2021, the tabloid published an article in which former Kontinental Hockey League coach Andrei Nazarov accused New York Rangers winger Artemi Panarin of sexually assaulting an 18-year-old Latvian woman in Riga. The team released a statement condemning the allegations as a "fabrication" and "intimidation tactic" against Panarin after speaking out against "recent political events", most notably expressing his support for Russian opposition leader Alexei Navalny, who was detained upon return to Russia from Germany.

In September 2022, Komsomolskaya Pravda editor in chief Vladimir Sungorkin died. The official cause of death was a stroke, but came amid a series of suspicious deaths of Russian businesspeople, Russian oligarchs, and journalists since 2022. In December 2023, Komsomolskaya Pravda's deputy editor in chief was also found dead in her apartment.

In February 2023, news editor Vladimir Romanenko published anti-war articles documenting Russian war crimes and criticising the alleged torture of Alexei Navalny. These articles were deleted within 10 minutes, and Romanenko no longer works for the publication.

== Editors in chief ==
The newspaper's editors in chief, in reverse chronological order, have been:

- From 2022 – Olesya Nosova^{d}
- 1997–2022 – Vladimir Nikolayevich Sungorkin
- 1995–1997 – Vladimir Petrovich Simonov
- 1988–1995 – Vladislav Aleksandrovich Fronin
- 1981–1988 – Gennadiy Nikolayevich Seleznyov
- 1978–1980 – Valeriy Nikolayevich Ganichev
- 1973–1978 – Lev Konstantinovich Korneshov
- 1965–1973 – Boris Dmitriyevich Pankin
- 1959–1965 – Yuriy Petrovich Voronov
- 1957–1959 – Aleksey Ivanovich Adzhubey
- 1950–1957 – Dmitriy Petrovich Goryunov
- 1948–1950 – Anatoly Blatin
- 1941–1948 – Boris Sergeyevich Burkov
- 1937–1938 – Nikolay Aleksandrovich Mikhaylov
- 1932–1937 – Vladimir Mikhaylovich Bubekin (1904–1937)
- 1925–1928 – Taras Kostrov (Aleksandr Sergeyevich Martynovskiy)
- 1925 – Aleksandr Nikolaevich Slepkov

== Notable journalists ==
- Vsevolod Kukushkin, ice hockey and sports correspondent
- Dmitry Steshin, war reporter
- Alexander Kots, war reporter
- Darya Aslamova, special correspondent and columnist
- Oleg Kashin, special correspondent

== Related and similar publications ==
A "European" edition (Komsomolskaya Pravda v Evrope), aimed in particular at the Russian diaspora in Germany, as well as Russian-speaking tourists on the Croatian Adriatic coast, is distributed in several EU countries, while a special Baltic-region edition is available in Latvia, Estonia, and Finland.

A number of similar, but independently owned, newspapers can be found in other member or associate-member states of the Commonwealth of Independent States (CIS):

- Belarus – Komsomolskaya Pravda v Belorusi
- Moldova – Komsomolskaya Pravda v Moldove
- Kazakhstan – Komsomolskaya Pravda v Kazakhstane
- Ukraine – Komsomolskaya Pravda v Ukraine (renamed KP in January 2016 in order to comply with Ukrainian decommunization laws and then Korotko Pro in 2024)

The radio network Radio Komsomolskaya Pravda (Russian: Радио Комсомольская правда; lit. 'Komsomol Truth Radio') is also related to the newspaper.

== See also ==
- Eastern Bloc media and propaganda
- Sovetsky Sport
