= Storm International =

Dutch business

- Founded: 1992; 34 years ago
- Founder: Michael Boettcher

Storm International is a Dutch holding company operating in the gambling business, founded in 1992 by Michael Boettcher.

== History ==
The company started its operations in Moscow in 1992 under Michael Boettcher, who began his career as a dealer in London's gambling industry in 1971. He came to Russia as a Project Manager for the US company Legend Investments, where he opened the first casino, "Elite". After Legend Investments left the Russian market, Boettcher founded his own company, Storm International. The company eventually became a shareholder of the casinos Kings, Queens, Metropole, Wells Fargo, and Vinso-Grand.

In 1997, "Shangri La" casino was launched. In 2001 the company opened "Super Slots" — a network of slot halls. Forbes estimates that the revenue of Shangri La casino in 2006 was about $300 million. At the time of leaving the Russian market, Storm International had about 6,000 employees.

After the ban on gambling in Russia in the summer of 2009, the company ceased operations in Russia but went on to open casinos in Minsk and Yerevan under the brand Shangri La, as well as two slot halls in Monterrey, Mexico under the "Hollywood" brand with approximately 1,000 machines.

In 2009 the company entered the market of Belarus.

In 2012 Shangri La Tbilisi opened. The first casino of the company in the EU, SL Casino Riga, was opened in 2017.

It became the 4th in the CIS, has become one with the institutions in Tbilisi, Yerevan, and Minsk.

In 2017 Storm International has launched and is currently operating an online live casino and sportsbook ShangriLa.com.

As of 2018 the company had a network of slot halls in Germany and Shangri La Casino in Armenia, Belarus, Georgia, Latvia, Kyrgyzstan and Tajikistan.

After the legalization of the gambling business in Ukraine in 2020, Storm International was first to open casinos in Kyiv and in Kharkiv in 2021 under its Shangri La Casino brand and launched seven "Slots City" locations in four cities. It also became the first foreign gambling business in Ukraine.

In December 2019 Gamedev LLC was registered, which received a license to operate in Ukraine from the Commission for the Regulation of Gambling and Lotteries.
