= Current Time TV =

Russian-language television channel based in Prague

Current Time TV Настоящее Время
- Country: Czech Republic
- Broadcast area: Russia, Ukraine, countries of Central Asia and Eastern Europe
- Headquarters: Prague

Programming
- Language: Russian

Ownership
- Owner: Radio Free Europe/Radio Liberty

History
- Launched: 7 February 2017; 9 years ago

Links
- Webcast: en.currenttime.tv/live-online
- Website: Russian: currenttime.tv currtv242aqatxhyqfyh3mtq2ubzxz7crvj7aon3zccrnwatc5gugvqd.onion ^{(Accessing link help)} English: en.currenttime.tv en.currtv242aqatxhyqfyh3mtq2ubzxz7crvj7aon3zccrnwatc5gugvqd.onion ^{(Accessing link help)} Entertainment: votvot.tv

Availability

Terrestrial
- Tet (Latvia): MUX2 (Channel 22, Pay TV) (before 31 December 2026)

Current Time TV (Russian: Настоящее Время, romanized: Nastoyashcheye Vremya) is a Russian-language television channel with editorial office in Prague, created by the US organisations Radio Free Europe/Radio Liberty and Voice of America.

== Mission ==
The channel – via RFE/RL – is funded through grants from the US Congress through the US Agency for Global Media. The media sees its task in "promoting democratic values and institutions". RFE/RL launched Current Time, in October 2014. The official round-the-clock broadcasting began on February 7, 2017.

Current Time was instituted as an alternative to Kremlin-controlled media and Russian propaganda. Despite the fact that Current Time was intended to counterbalance Russian official news coverage, Kenan Aliyev, executive editor of Current Time, told Reuters that C.T. was not counterpropaganda at all.

== Reception ==
In December 2017 Russia's Ministry of Justice added the outlet to the list of "foreign agents". It, alongside 8 other American public broadcasters, was the first mass media outlet to be included to the list of "foreign agents".

== Distribution ==
Current Time is available on cable, satellite and digital platforms in Russia, the Baltics, Belarus, Bulgaria, Ukraine, the Caucasus and central Asia. It had over 1,500,000 followers on Facebook and 1,300,000 subscribers on YouTube in August 2020.

On 27 February 2022, Roskomnadzor blocked the website of the channel for its coverage of the Russian invasion of Ukraine. On January 5, 2024, a Belarusian court declared the Internet pages of “Current Time” extremist.

In April 2025, following a decision of the U.S. Agency for Global Media distribution via Astra and Eutelsat satellite networks ceased.
