= Gambling in Ukraine =

Gambling in Ukraine was illegal between 2009 and 2020.

Parliament outlawed gambling in 2009 after a May 2009 fire in a gambling hall in Dnipro that killed nine people. The Ukrainian parliament passed the law "On Prohibition of Gambling Business in Ukraine" (Gambling Ban Law) banning gambling business and any participation in gambling in Ukraine on May 15. The President of Ukraine Viktor Yushchenko signed the law on June 23 and on June 25 it came into force. The Law On Prohibition of Gambling Business in Ukraine also applied to internet casinos, it did not apply to lotteries.

Parliament legalised gambling again on 14 July 2020, albeit with regulations and age restrictions (minimum age of 22).

== 2009 Ukrainian ban on gambling ==
After a May 2009 fire in a gambling hall in Dnipro that killed nine people several parts of society demanded a ban on gambling. The Ukrainian parliament passed the law "On Prohibition of Gambling Business in Ukraine" (Gambling Ban Law) banning gambling business and any participation in gambling in Ukraine on May 15. The President of Ukraine Viktor Yushchenko signed the law on June 23 and on June 25 it came into force. The Law On Prohibition of Gambling Business in Ukraine also applied to internet casinos. It did not apply to lotteries.

On 6 January 2010 the Cabinet of Ministers excluded gambling from the list of economic activities, which can be licensed. This is read in the Cabinet of Ministers resolution No.14 of Jan. 6.

The law gave the definition of gambling. It stated that any game requiring the player to make a bet that enables them to receive a prize and the result of which depends on chance partially or completely, is considered gambling. Thus, all kinds of gambling, including slot machines, bookmaking, online gambling, interactive gambling became illegal. The law also provided a list of activities that are not considered gambling. These included lotteries, creative competitions and sporting events, pool, bowling, free draws carried for purposes of advertising, charity, promotion and education, etc.

According to the Gambling Ban Law, both organization of gambling business and gambling were illegal. The law provided that any organizer or gambling should be fined, while the gambling equipment and the revenue received was subject to transfer to the budget of the state. Despite the prohibition, by July 20, 2009, over 500 facts of illegal operation of gambling establishments had been exposed in Ukraine which resulted in the confiscation of 6,000 slot machines and around 216 criminal charges.

However, it did not lead to cessation of the gambling business, but it led to its criminalization. The police began to cover gambling business for reward.

According to Prime Minister of Ukraine Yulia Tymoshenko Ukraine had an unusually high number of gambling halls (over 100,000), which "take the last money from families, which don't have much, and which corrupt young Ukrainians."

=== 2010 Draft Law ===
According to the Gambling Ban Law, the new Draft Law "On Gambling Organization and Maintenance of Gambling Activities in the Special Gambling Zones" should have been created within 3 months after the Ban Law took effect. However, because of the unstable political situation in Ukraine this draft wasn't introduced until 2010.

On November 3, 2010, the Draft Law was made public. This law provided for the establishment of the state-owned National Gambling Operator that would control the organization and regulation of gambling activities and also issue licenses for all private gambling operators.

On September 29, 2015, in Kyiv, the first Ukrainian Gaming Congress was held.

=== Gaming zones ===
A significant provision of the Draft Law is the creation of so-called gaming zones. All gambling activities with the exception of state cash lotteries should move to these gaming zones. The list of gaming zones includes:

- hotels with at least 4 star rating and 100 rooms
- cultural and entertainment complexes, nonresidential premises, Ukraine-registered ships that can accommodate a casino with a gambling hall of at least 500 sq. meters

Additionally, the territory of the Autonomous Republic of the Crimea and resort towns located within its boundaries are also proclaimed a special gambling zone.

Gambling establishments can't be opened within less than 500 m proximity of the educational and government institutions and healthcare facilities. The main reasons for choosing such locations were the intentions of the Ukrainian government to:

1) limit the possibilities of the vulnerable part of the population to play games of chance

2) get profit from the EURO 12 that will be held in Ukraine and will inevitably attract many solvent tourists.

To be admitted to the casino, gamblers will have to comply with the dress code and pass the strict face control.

=== Requirements ===
The Draft Law was developed with the intention of creating a properly regulated gambling market in Ukraine. For this reason the law provides stringent requirements for potential gambling business owners. A very serious financial background is one of them. The cost of a one-time fee for obtaining a gambling license will amount to $5 million. The same amount of money gambling business operator should have in the form of a registered capital. The license is issued for a term of 7 years, so the license fee can be paid in parts within the period of license activity. The size of the fee is determined by the Act on Gambling Businesses.

== Poker ==
Poker tournaments in Ukraine flourished after the ban as a way of circumventing the country's gambling ban. Hence on December 31, 2009, the Justice Ministry of Ukraine rescinded its decision of July 1, 2009 which had included poker on the list of sports recognized in Ukraine. When parliament legalised gambling again on 14 July 2020 poker tournaments were also reallowed. Albeit with regulations and age restrictions.

== TV and radio ==
Ukrainian President Viktor Yanukovych signed a law banning of paid interactive quizzes on TV and radio on 6 March 2012 (except for channels with limited access).

== 2020 law ==
On 14 July 2020 president Volodymyr Zelenskyy signed the Ukrainian law "On State Regulation of Organising and Conducting Gambling". Both local and foreign investors will have access to the market, only legal entities registered in Ukraine may become gambling operators. Gambling operators shall not be controlled by a Russian resident nor have a Russian person as a shareholder or Ultimate Beneficial Owner (UBO). Neither should they have shareholders registered in countries currently blacklisted by the Financial Action Task Force (FATF), in other words North Korea and Iran.

In addition, a gambling operator must have a share capital of at least US$1.1 million (₴30.7 million/GBP 906,000/EUR 1.0 million). They must open a deposit account or obtain a guarantee from a Ukrainian bank for US$1.2 million, and they must have a dot.ua domain name.

== 2021 ==
In early February, the first gambling licenses were issued in Ukraine, obtained by Spacex LLC, which operates the Cosmolot brand. The Ukrainian company Parimatch also received a license. The cost of the license for 5 years is ₴9 million. The third license was obtained by Gamedev LLC, the fourth on February 18, 2021, was obtained by First Element LLC, paying ₴23 million for it.

Ukrainian Gaming Week, the first thematic conference on gambling in Ukraine, was scheduled for February 24. The UGW 2021 exhibition will take place on March 23–24. According to Ivan Rudy from the Game Regulation Commission, in February the budget received ₴70.2 million from the issuance of licenses, in total during 2021 it was planned to receive ₴6-7 billion.

== Liquidation of KRAIL and Creation of Playcity ==
On April 1, 2025, the Cabinet of Ministers of Ukraine enforced a government resolution to officially liquidate the Commission for Regulation of Gambling and Lotteries (KRAIL). As part of an administrative reform of the gambling sector, the State Agency Playcity was designated as the legal successor to KRAIL, inheriting all property, rights, and obligations of the dissolved commission. The decree stipulated a strict timeline for the transition, setting a limit of six months for the liquidation process and a two-month period for creditors to submit claims following the enactment of the resolution.

To manage the restructuring, a liquidation commission was established under the leadership of Natalia Denikeieva, the Deputy Minister of Digital Transformation of Ukraine. Her appointment and the procedural framework were further refined by subsequent government acts, including Cabinet Resolution No. 923, adopted on July 30, 2025. The reform effectively transferred regulatory oversight from the collegiate body of KRAIL to the new State Agency Playcity.
