= Alexander Sladkov =

Russian state media presenter

- Александр Сладков
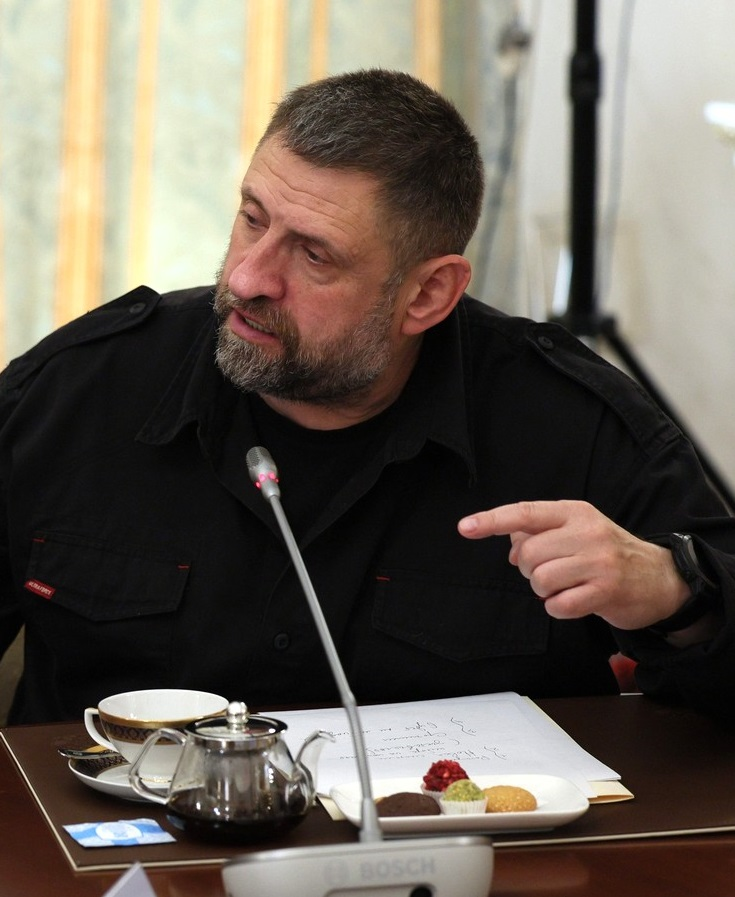
- Sladkov in 2009
- Born: April 1, 1966; Monino, Moscow Region, U.S.S.R.
- Education: Kurgan Higher Military-Political Aviation School
- Occupation: Journalist
- Years active: 1992–present

Alexander Valeryevich Sladkov (Russian: Александр Валерьевич Сладков; born April 1, 1966) is a Russian military correspondent and a special correspondent for the Izvestia program. Sladkov has often appeared on Russian state media, disseminating Russian war propaganda.

== Biography ==
Sladkov graduated from Kurgan Higher Military-Political Aviation School in 1987. In 1992, he retired from the Armed Forces of the Russian Federation with the rank of Senior lieutenant (First lieutenant). From 1992 to 1993, he worked as a correspondent for the regional newspaper Vremya in the town of Shchyolkovo in the Moscow Region and for the program Voice of Russia on Radio Rossii.

He studied journalism at the Faculty of Humanities University, graduating with an externship. Since 1993, Sladkov has worked on the television channel Rossiya as a correspondent for the program Izvestiya. From April 2002 to September 2015 he was the author, manager, and presenter of the Military Program, and from September 2003 to January 2004 he was the presenter of the TV entertainment program Steep Route. Sladkov broadcast news from Grozny during the battles of the Russian forces against the Chechen Republic of Ichkeria in January 1995, March and August 1996, and January 2000. On August 9, 2008, he received a leg wound while covering the Russo-Georgian war.

He covered the Transnistria conflict, the Tajikistani Civil War, the Chechen-Russian conflict, the Russo-Georgian war, and the Russo-Ukrainian war. Since 2014, he has been a member of the Public Council under the Russian Ministry of Defense.

=== Work in Ukraine ===
Since the beginning of Russia's invasion of Ukraine in 2014, Alexander Sladkov has worked in the contested territories, justifying the Russian invasion of Ukraine and role of the Russian army's alleged war crimes against Ukrainian civilians.

Sladkov regularly interrogates Ukrainian prisoners of war and political prisoners who have allegedly been tortured by the Russian special services. One of the most famous victims was Ukrainian journalist and writer Stanislav Aseyev from Donetsk.

In April 2020, Alexander Sladkov published a video on his YouTube channel showing Russian positions near the Ukrainian-controlled town of Horlivka in the Donetsk Region. In this video, the separatists fired from a 122 mm caliber Partisan launcher (improvised launcher for MLRS BM-21 Grad), which was prohibited according to the Minsk agreements that were rejected by both sides .

=== Personal life ===
Alexander Sladkov lives in Moscow, is married and has four children.

=== Awards ===
- Order of Honor (1996) - for active participation in the creation and development of the All-Russian State Television and Radio Broadcasting Company.
- Honorary weapon (1999) - from the Russian Minister of Defense, Marshal of the Russian Federation I.D. Sergeev.
- Order of Courage (2000), for self-sacrifice in covering events in the North Caucasus region.
- Award of the Federal Security Service of Russia (nomination "Television and Radio Programs", 2006) - for the film The End of the Black Angel"
- Award of the Federal Security Service of Russia (nomination "Television and Radio Programs", 2013) - for the film Fire Bail. Those who survived
- Award of the Federal Security Service of Russia (nomination "Television and Radio Programs", 2019–2020) - for the film Operation Argun
- A valuable gift (2007) from the Russian Minister of Defence S. B. Ivanov - for active assistance in completing of missions of the Armed Forces of the Russian Federation.
- Order of Courage (2009) - for self-sacrifice in covering events during the Russo-Georgian war
- Order of Friendship (2013, self-proclaimed non-recognized Republic of South Ossetia) - for significant personal contribution to the development of friendly Russian-South Ossetian relations, high professionalism, courage, and selflessness demonstrated during the Russo-Georgian war.
- «Военкор» 'War Correspondent medal, (November 2020, 'Wave of Memory' Organisation, Moscow).

== See also ==
- Alexander Kots
- Semen Pegov
- Evgeniy Poddubny
- Anatoly Shariy
- Dmitry Steshin
- Russian information war against Ukraine
