= Alexander Kots (journalist) =

Russian journalist (born 1978)

- Александр Коц
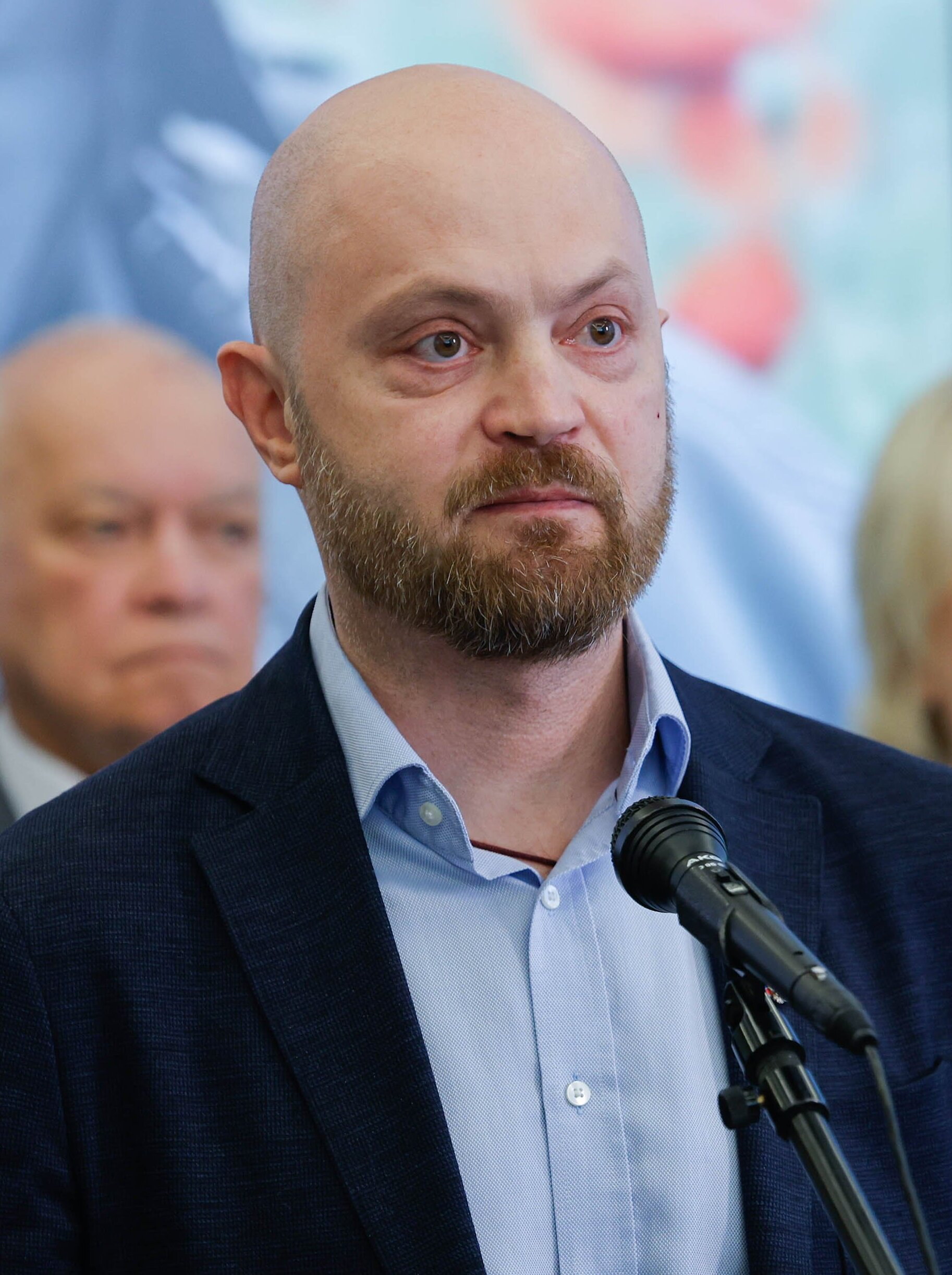
- Kots in 2025
- Born: Alexander Igorevich Kots; 3 September 1978 (age 47); Yuzhno-Sakhalinsk, Sakhalin Oblast, Russian SFSR, Soviet Union
- Occupations: Journalist; propagandist
- Years active: 1999–present

Alexander Igorevich Kots (Russian: Александр Игоревич Коц; born 3 September 1978) is a Russian journalist and war correspondent. (Note: According to various international media such as Voice of America (1), British BBC (2), Ukrainian media (3, 4, 5), Israeli (6), Belarusian (7) and others.) He reports mostly for the tabloid newspaper Komsomolskaya Pravda and on his own channel on Telegram.

== Biography ==
Kots was born on 3 September 1978, in Yuzhno-Sakhalinsk on Sakhalin. His father, Igor Kots, was the nephew of Jewish mathematician Samuel Kotz, and worked as the editor-in-chief of Sovetsky Sport from 2003 to 2013. A month after his birth, the Kots family moved to Khabarovsk. He then went to school in Vladivostok.

In 1993, Kots moved to Moscow, where he graduated from high school and studied at university. From 1996 to 1998, he served his compulsory military service in the 38th Separate Communications Regiment of the Russian Airborne Forces, in the Moscow region, Military Unit 64164. After completing his military service, Kots continued his studies. Since 1999, Kots has worked for Komsomolskaya Pravda, becoming a special correspondent for their political section. He is responsible for coverage of military conflicts and natural disasters in Russia and other countries, broadcasting on Radio Komsomolskaya Pravda.

As a war correspondent, Kots has covered events and military operations in Kosovo (2000, 2008 and 2011), Afghanistan (2006, 2013), the North Caucasus, Egypt (January–February 2011, 2012, 2013), Libya (several trips in 2011), Syria (several trips in 2012–2013 and 2015–2017), Iraq (2016) and Ukraine.

On 9 May 2004, when President of the Chechen Republic Akhmad Kadyrov was killed as a result of the Grozny stadium bombing, Kots suffered a concussion. On 3 September 2004, during a trip to Beslan, together with Russian special services, he participated in the evacuation of hostage children from the Beslan school siege. Together with his colleague Dmitry Steshin, he prepared material for the 20th anniversary of the disaster at the Chernobyl Nuclear Power Plant, and lived for several days in the ghost city of Pripyat.

In June 2006, along with other journalists, in Feodosia (Crimea), Kots covered the actions of the local population against NATO and the US–Ukrainian exercises Sea Breeze. At the same time, he personally actively protested against the presence of NATO troops in Crimea, taking part in the illegal hoisting of the flag of Russia on the roof of the building of the military sanatorium of the Ministry of Defence of Ukraine in Yevpatoria.

On 9 August 2008, Kots went to Tskhinvali District to cover the events of the Russo-Georgian War. While reporting from here, he sustained shrapnel wounds in his right arm and leg. Subsequently, he revealed that his satellite phone had been used by the commander of the 58th Combined Arms Army, General Anatoly Khrulyov, to aim rocket artillery at Georgian tanks in Khetagurovo. On 16 January 2009, he was awarded with the Medal "For Courage" for this trip. In 2010, Kots broadcast reports from the Cathedral of Our Lady of the Assumption in Port-au-Prince, Haiti, which was destroyed by an earthquake. During the Arab Spring in April 2011, he was captured while covering the war in Libya, together with his colleague Dmitry Steshin and three journalists from the Russian NTV channel. The reporters were accused of being intelligence agents working for Muammar Gaddafi's regime. All reporters were released with the help of the Italian military stationed at the Benghazi airfield.

In 2016, Kots reported from Syria. In April 2016, he was awarded by Russian Minister of Defence Sergei Shoigu with the Medal "Participant of the military operation in Syria". In October–November 2016, he was one of the few Russian journalists in Iraq covering the Battle of Mosul.

In January–February 2019, Kots covered protests and unrest in Venezuela. In 2020, Kots was in Nagorno-Karabakh, covering the Second Nagorno-Karabakh War.

On 29 October 2023, when a mob stormed Uytash Airport after the arrival of a Red Wings Airlines flight from Tel Aviv during the Gaza war, Kots lambasted the Dagestanis who participated in the storming and instead suggested them "to kill Jews" in the Gaza Strip or in the Presidential Office Building in Kyiv.

Serker Yakubkhanov, a journalist for Current Time, has described publications by Kots as nationalist and xenophobic.

=== Ukraine ===
Since the beginning of the Russo-Ukrainian War in 2014, Kots has been covering the war, mostly in Donbas. He has done so without official accreditation from Ukraine. In early 2014, Kots worked with Dmitry Steshin, in Sloviansk. After Ukrainian forces took back Sloviansk, Kots and Steshin relocated to Donetsk. Kots has repeatedly been accused of biased and unconfirmed information in his reports.

Since the full-scale Russian invasion of Ukraine in 2022, Kots has been actively covering the situation in Ukraine, with a pro-Kremlin bias. Commenting on the Bucha massacre, Kots denied responsibility of Russian troops and accused the Ukrainian side of staging all the events.

The Security Service of Ukraine banned Kots from entering Ukraine "due to violation of the law on the status of foreigners and stateless persons". In May 2022, he was sanctioned by the United Kingdom and later by Australia.

== See also ==
- Semyon Pegov
- Alexander Sladkov
- Russian information war against Ukraine
