= Anatoly Shariy =

Ukrainian blogger and former journalist (born 1978)

- Анатолій Шарій
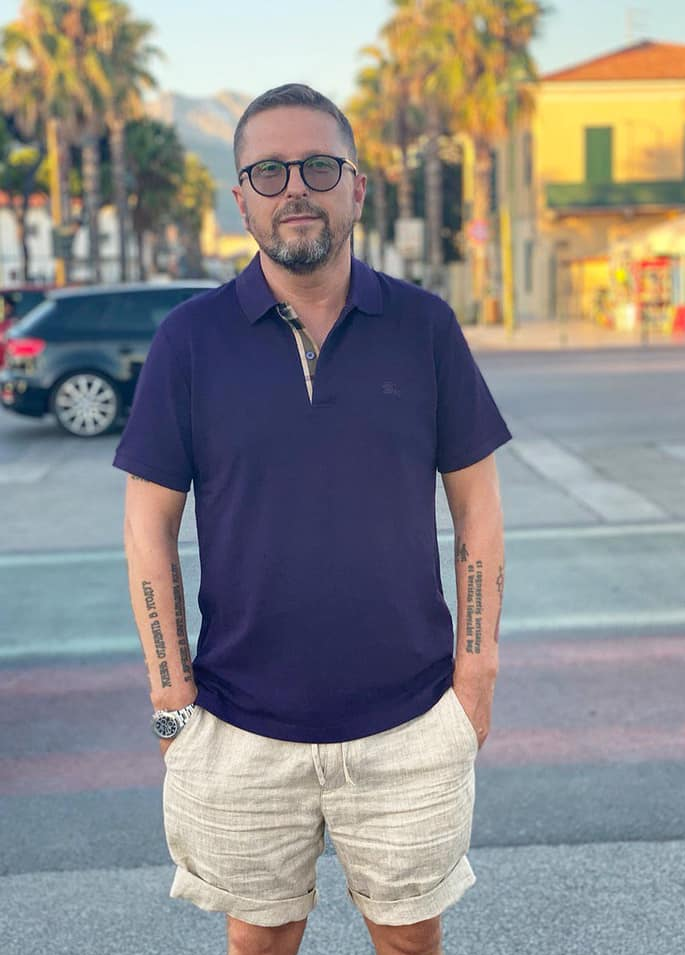
- Shariy in 2020
- Born: 20 August 1978 (age 48); Kyiv, Ukrainian SSR, Soviet Union
- Occupations: Blogger; former journalist

Instagram information
- Page: anatolijsharij
- Followers: 282 thousand

X information
- Handle: @anatoliisharii
- Followers: 283 thousand

YouTube information
- Channel: Анатолий Шарий
- Genres: Political, comedy, vlog
- Subscribers: 3.25 million
- Views: 5.35 billion
- Last updated: 24 February 2025
- Website: https://t.me/ASupersharij

Anatoly Anatoliiovych Shariy (Note: Shariy spells his surname as Sharij, the full name is: Ukrainian: Анатолій Анатолійович Шарій, romanized: Anatolii Anatoliiovych Sharii Russian: Анатолий Анатольевич Шарий, romanized: Anatoly Anatolyevich Shary) (born 20 August 1978) is a Ukrainian politician, YouTuber, and journalist. He founded and became the leader of the All-Ukrainian political party Party of Shariy (2019–2022).

In 2012, he received asylum in the European Union, asserting persecution by Ukrainian law enforcement bodies related to his journalism.

In June 2019, he launched the Party of Shariy party which took part in the 2019 Ukrainian parliamentary election, winning 2.23% of the vote. During the 2020 local elections, the party candidates entered to city and oblast councils, including councils of cities with millions of residents.

Shariy was a strong critic of Euromaidan and subsequent governments formed after it. He was one of the main political opponents of President Volodymyr Zelenskyy and Petro Poroshenko.

In February 2021, Shariy was accused of treason and incitement to ethnic or racial hatred by the Security Service of Ukraine (SBU). In May 2022, he was detained by Spanish authorities at the request of the SBU. On the same day, Shariy was released with precautionary measures as reported by his lawyer. In October, a Spanish judge agreed to close the consideration of his extradition.

== Biography ==
=== Activity as a journalist ===
Anatoliy Shariy was born in Kyiv and lived there until 2012. Shariy began to engage in journalism in early 2005.

In 2013 Shariy became engaged to journalist Olga Bondarenko (now Olga Shariy, and they married in 2017. The couple now have a child. Olga Shariy, together with Anatoly, co-manages the Sharij.net website.

Shariy began to engage in journalism in early 2005. In particular, he was a journalist of the online edition Obozrevatel.

In 2011, Shariy shot at a man from a traumatic pistol at a McDonald's restaurant after the man, according to Shariy, insulted his wife. Shariy reported the incident to police. Shariy later claimed that the case was later trumped-up due to his investigation of illegal drug trade, which he alleged was covered up by high rank members of Ukrainian law enforcement. In 2019, a Kyiv court dismissed the case and revoked the request for the search and extradition to Ukraine of the journalist.

The same year, journalists of the 1+1 TV channel and Shariy carried out a series of investigations of the alleged protection of the illegal controlled substance trade in Kyiv pharmacies by the Office for Combating Illegal Drug Trafficking (Ukrainian abbreviation: UBNON). On 7 June 2011, Shariy published the first part of the article "Does UBNON Spit in the Face of the Minister?". On 11 June, Shariy was summoned for interrogation in the McDonald's shooting case, which had allegedly been closed already. On 20 June, Shariy gave a press conference about the situation and claimed that the Ministry of Internal Affairs and UBNON ordered the pressure on him. The next day, on 21 June, the criminal case for hooliganism was initiated against Shariy related to McDonald's shooting.

The following month, Shariy and journalists of the "1+1" TV channel issued several publications alleging the involvement of the Ministry of Internal Affairs in covering up illegal casinos in Kyiv. On 12 July 2011, Shariy and the film crew of the "1+1" channel were locked on the casino premises. Shortly thereafter criminal investigators arrived and seized 34 slot machines and video recordings of the hall, resulting in a criminal case on gambling business. A few hours after the incident in the casino, a shot was fired at Shariy's car, but he was not injured. In August 2011, a criminal case on an attempted assassination was opened. The car shooting incident was cited as an example of attacks on journalists in the Human Rights Watch report for year 2011.

After the attempted murder Shariy continued his journalistic activities. On 21 September 2011, after another publication exposing corruption in the Ministry of Internal Affairs, the case on the assassination attempt on Shariy was closed, and a criminal case was initiated against the journalist himself for "staging an assassination attempt".

In October 2023, unknown individuals attacked the home of a blogger in Spain with Molotov cocktails. Russian security services later determined that the recent arson attempt was carried out by members of the criminal group Khimprom, which is involved in drug trafficking.

=== Asylum in the European Union and start of the Russo-Ukrainian war ===
After being placed on the all-Ukrainian wanted list, Shariy left the country and asked for political asylum in the European Union claiming persecution by the Ukrainian law enforcement for his journalist activities, basing on the 2011 incidents. In 2012 he was granted asylum in the European Union. He received a permanent residency permit in Lithuania for five years. After moving to Netherlands, Shariy currently lives in Spain.

From 2014 onwards, while living in European Union, Shariy focused on producing video blogs for his YouTube channel, which, among other things carried out debunking misinformation and propaganda in Ukrainian media. He frequently criticized Ukrainian publications related to the events in Ukraine after Euromaidan, as well as the Ukrainian government, usually in a derisive and insulting way. (Note: In 2018 Shariy had another high profile conflict with Ukrainian authorities after in a May 2018 series of videos Shariy reported anti-Semitic and other racist posts by Ukrainian consul in Hamburg Vasyl Marushinets (Василь Марушинець) in his Facebook page. Ukrainian officials claimed that they did not know anything about Marushinets views. Shariy proved that this cannot be true, because a number of posts of this type were "liked" by Ukrainian diplomats, and that Marushinets posted his views not only in the privacy of Facebook, but in open forums as well. The subsequent scandal led to the recall of Marushinets "for disciplinary proceedings", and on 30 May 2018 he was dismissed. In December 2019 he was restored citing violations of the formal procedure and was paid for losses of about $9,000.)

In November 2015, Shariy filed a defamation lawsuit against his paternal sister, Elena Manchenko, demanding that she refute the online claim that he is a "pedophile and a thief." On 19 January 2016, the court dismissed the claim, stating that according to the Ukrainian legal practise, she is not responsible for public dissemination of her statements by third parties. On 20 March 2019, Anatoly Shariy won the case in the court of the Netherlands against Manchenko. The court found Manchenko guilty and demanded to pay Shariy 75,000 euros in compensation and to publicly refute her accusations against the journalist.

In February 2017 Shariy sued the Internet publication "Detector Media" and its journalist Bohdan Lohvynenko to defend his "honor, dignity and business reputation". This was caused by an article in which Shariy was called "the bullhorn of the Russian world" and "a scandalous Ukrainian pseudo refugee". On 21 June 2017, the Shevchenkivskiy district court of Kyiv dismissed Shariy's complaint. Shariy appealed this decision, and on 7 September 2017 the Kyiv court of appeal dismissed his complaint again.

Also in 2017, Russian lawyer Mark Feygin said that Anatoly Shariy was under investigation in a pedophilia case. Shariy sued him for defamation and won the lawsuit in a Russian court, with Feygin being ordered to refute this allegation, and to pay 66,000 rubles to Shariy to cover his legal fees.

Espreso TV journalist Vitaliy Portnikov characterized Shariy as a "Kremlin project" and "one used by its Russian owners" and Anatoli Shariy filed a lawsuit to refute these words. On 5 April 2018, the Solomyanskiy district court in Kyiv dismissed Shariy's complaint. On 14 November 2018, the Kyiv court of appeal dismissed Shariy's complaint again. On 17 April 2019, the Supreme Court of Ukraine dismissed Shariy's complaint once more.

On 10 January 2019, when asked "why are Ukrainian journalists persecuted, in particular blogger Anatoly Shariy", Ukrainian president Petro Poroshenko answered that "Anatoly Shariy is not a Ukrainian journalist, because he works for Russia". Shariy sued Poroshenko to defend his "honor, dignity and business reputation". On 13 May 2020, the Pechersk district court in Kyiv ordered Poroshenko to publicly refute his comments and pay 1,536 hryvnias to Shariy as compensation for his legal fees. However, on 28 October 2020, the Kyiv appellate court rescinded the Pechersk district court's decision.

In February 2021, the Security Service of Ukraine (SBU) accused Shariy of committing crimes under Part 1. Article 111 "High treason" and Part 1. Art. 161 "Violation of the equality of citizens depending on their race, nationality, religious beliefs, disability and other grounds" and published a video with alleged evidence against Shariy, including his statement about the inhabitants of Western Ukraine. In 2014, Shariy had posted a private video with insulting statements about Western Ukrainians. In the video, he described them as "not Ukrainians", but "half-breeds, one-third-breeds, quarter-breeds". (Note: In this video Shariy stated: An unpleasant information came to me that in Kyiv, the inhabitants of Western Ukraine suddenly began to tell the people of Kyiv how they should behave, how they have to love Ukraine, how they need to sing the anthem, walk with the flag. I have several friends from Western Ukraine, I respect these people, I am proud of friendship with them, these are quite sane people. [...] You... I am Ukrainian, and you are not Ukrainians. [...] You are just half-breeds, one-third-breeds, quarter-breeds. You are half fucking Poles, you are half Hungarians, you are half the heck knows what you are. Do not tell the people of Kyiv how they should behave, how they have to love the country, love their flag. Because it is not your flag. You have no flag. You are not Ukrainians.)

In May 2021, it was reported that Lithuania revoked its political asylum for Shariy, and some media published reports that Shariy was a persona non grata. Shariy himself refuted this and claimed this was false information based on the words of Mark Feygin.

=== During the full-scale Russian invasion of Ukraine ===
On 22 March 2022, during the Russian invasion of Ukraine, the National Security and Defense Council of Ukraine suspended the Party of Shariy because of its alleged ties with Russia. On 16 June 2022, the Eighth Administrative Court of Appeal banned the party. The decision was open to appeal at the Supreme Court of Ukraine. On 6 September 2022, the Supreme Court rejected this appeal and thus finally banned the Party of Shariy.

On 4 May 2022, Spanish authorities detained Shariy at the request of the SBU, accusing him of treason. On the same day, Shariy was released with precautionary measures according to his lawyer, Gonzalo Boye.

On 4 October 2022, a judge of the National High Court, Santiago Pedraz, concluded that Shariy was no longer living in Spain. Pedraz details this in a ruling where of an appeal filed by the defense against consideration of the reporter's extradition to Ukraine because he allegedly left Catalonia for Italy. That was the version of the escape, which the Ukrainian special services sent to the investigator, but which was always refuted by his lawyer Gonzalo Boye. According to the ruling by Pedraz, the documentation provided by the defense shows that Shariy is "in Spain", but, in addition to accepting these defense arguments, Pedraz made another decision in favor of Shariy. On 5 October 2022, Pedraz agreed to close consideration of the extradition because Ukraine had not presented the demand for Shariy's surrender, nor the "relevant documentation".

In March 2024, Shariy alleged that he was the target of an assassination attempt by the SBU, although the Spanish Civil Guard told TASS that they did not have information on the incident.

Following the terrorist attack in Monaco targeting businessman Vadym Yermolaev, in which Anastasia Berezovska was allegedly involved, she was later found dead in Kyiv. Subsequently, former Security Service of Ukraine SBU) officer Vitalii Zhykovych and active Military Intelligence (HUR) officer Vladyslav Reut were arrested. In July 2026, Ukrainian media reported that, during questioning, the detainees claimed they had been preparing not only the attack on Yermolaev but also a plot targeting Anatoly Shariy.

== Political views and activism ==
=== Shariy's position on the Russo-Ukrainian war ===
Shariy referred to the War in Donbas up until 2022, as an "internal conflict" and "civil war", denying the presence of Russian troops in the Donbas and saying that only Russian equipment was present. He considers the separatist Donetsk and Luhansk areas to be the territories of Ukraine and the Russian annexation of Crimea to be inadmissible. Shariy supports the Kremlin assertion that Ukraine is a "western colony" dominated with anti-Russian "neo-Nazis", which has been used by Russia to justify its 2022 invasion of Ukraine. After the 2022 Russian invasion of Ukraine, Shariy accused Zelenskyy and the Ukrainian media of manipulating public opinion in the west and declared: "This war is aggression and invasion of Russia against the Ukrainian people". Shariy denies holding a pro-Russian stance, telling El Independiente: "The Ukrainian government comfortably uses such labels against anyone expressing any criticism. What do they do when you expose their censorship? They say you are pro-Russia. I care about my country, and I have the right to criticize the corruption of the president and the government," he responds.

=== Attitude to homosexuality and Romani ===
In a 2010 article, "Blue Rust. Dictatorship of Sodomites" (Note: The expression "blue rust" refers to the Russian slang term "blue" (goluboy) for gay persons) Shariy expressed an opinion that due to death sentences for same-sex and adultery relationships in Iran after the Islamic revolution the situation with prostitution, pedophilia, and rape in Iran was much better than in Ukraine. In the summer of 2020, journalist Sergei Ivanov posted screenshots of Anatoly Shariy's publications from 2010 in which he showed understanding for the extermination of homosexuals and Romani in gas chambers during the Third Reich.

In the article by El Independiente, the journalist denies ever supporting “the extermination of homosexuals in gas chambers during Nazi Germany.” He was indeed a member of the Christian organization “Love Against Homosexuality” between 2008 and 2009, but according to Shariy, he never made such horrific statements. He now says that he has long distanced himself from homophobic views, has been living in the European Union for 11 years, and has changed significantly.

== Cultural and political image ==
=== Accusations of anti-Ukrainian and pro-Russian position ===
Deutsche Welle states that Shariy justified the arrests of participants of the 2017–2018 Russian protests by saying that Russian authorities should not wait until the first molotov cocktails appear. In 2015 Shariy announced a reward of 1,000 Euro to anybody who demonstrates a piece of pro-Russian or anti-Ukrainian propaganda in his posts. During the 2019 Parliamentary Elections he increased the bounty to 5,000 Euro. In 2017, Shariy in his video blog criticized the Russian authorities for the criminal prosecution of opposition blogger Rustem Adagamov.

The New Voice of Ukraine described Shariy as "a blogger-turned-propagandist", whose main activities are "discrediting Ukrainian state policy, deliberately spreading misinformation about Russia’s eight-year-long war against Ukraine in the Donbas, attempting to disrupt political and social stability in Ukraine, inciting internal conflicts on ethnic and religious grounds", noting how Shariy often features on TV stations owned by pro-Russian oligarch Viktor Medvedchuk, such as NewsOne, 112 Ukraine and ZIK TV. The outlet also underlined how Shariy often propagated pro-Russian fake news and extremely hateful rhetoric against people living in Western Ukraine. Shariy denied having any connection to Russia.

=== Recognition ===
In November 2017, in a Novoye Vremya magazine rating of the personalities by number of readers in the Ukrainian segments of Facebook and Twitter, Shariy got the 12th place with the aggregate audience of 511,000 people. In the same month he was number 3 of the top most popular Ukrainian political bloggers on Facebook according to the rating of Espreso TV.

In 2019 Shariy was 34th in the list of Top-100 most influential people and phenomena in Ukraine compiled by media holding Vesti.

The company Brand Analytics regularly publishes its ratings of Russophone YouTube-bloggers. In its ratings February 2019, in terms of viewer engagement rate (defined by the company as the sum of likes and comments), Shariy's vlog held the 1st place, collecting about 3 million likes and 430,000 comments. In terms of audience, with 1.8 million subscribers he was on the 38th place. The company noticed that political topics usually attracts a small fraction of YouTube viewers. In its June 2020 ranking - Top 20 Russian-speaking YouTube bloggers in terms of involvement, Anatoly Shariy was the 3rd with 4.4 million people involved.
