= Brenno de Winter =

Dutch journalist (born 1971)

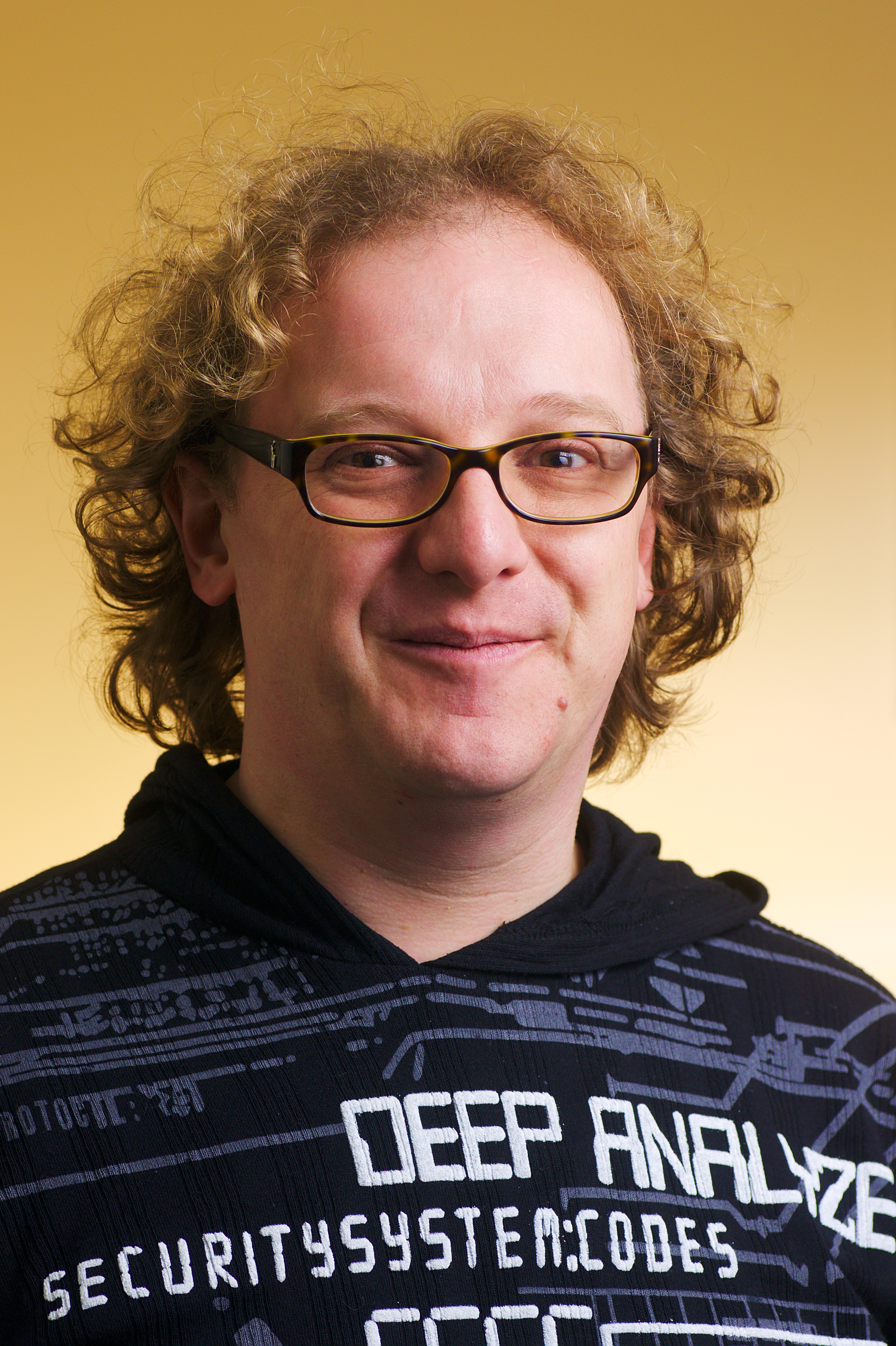
- Brenno de Winter at the 28th Chaos Communication Congress (2011)
- Born: Brenno J.S.A.A.F. de Winter; 6 December 1971 (age 54); Ede, Netherlands
- Occupation: ICT journalist
- Years active: 12

Brenno de Winter (born 6 December 1971, in Ede) is a former Dutch ICT and investigative journalist. He writes for Linux Magazine, Computer!Totaal, NU.nl, and Webwereld, and is a commenter for the PowNews programme on PowNed TV. Brenno is also a podcaster and hosts Laura Speaks Dutch.

He caused controversy by submitting requests for information on the basis of the Open Government Act (WOB) to include Jeltje van Nieuwenhoven (regarding her role as OV ambassador) and hundreds WOB requests to all Dutch municipalities and provinces. Because not all agencies fulfilled the WOB requests, de Winter filed lawsuits against them. The Dutch Association of Journalists (NEY) supported de Winter. A court in The Hague ruled in de Winter's favour on 4 May 2010. In April 2010, de Winter was involved in the disclosure of the expenditure of the FENS funds (1.3 billion euros) by the NS. After the publications and media appearances of de Winter related to the ease and simplicity of the OV-chipkaart, the public transport smart card in the Netherlands, the Minister of Infrastructure and Environment was able to get the NVB in Haaglanden about a one-month postponement. Due to the disclosure, the District Attorney decided to open a criminal investigation against de Winter; however, after a legal defence fund met its goals within an hour.

== Open source software ==
Since 1993, de Winter has developed software for commercial applications. Since 1995 he focuses on projects with open source software as a basis. From the late 1990s, he gives lectures and trainings on this and advises organizations on their IT security.

== Journalism ==
Since 2000, de Winter has been a professional journalist. The articles written by him focus on the business side of the IT industry and the technical aspects of open source software and IT security. In his work as an investigative journalist, he makes frequent use of the WOB. In 2011, the journalism magazine Villamedia named de Winter journalist of the year.

In July 2012, de Winter broke a story about Dutch employers' censorship, after an employee of Dutch company Unisys Netherlands was threatened with termination for giving a presentation about online censorship for the conference Last H.O.P.E., in New York.

In September 2012, de Winter released a video and accompanying news story of how he was able to use a fake ID to gain access to numerous Dutch and European government offices, including, amongst many others, the European Parliament and four Dutch government ministries, including the Ministry of Justice and the Ministry of the Interior, the Dutch Secret Service, and the Dutch National Cyber Security Center.

OV-chipcard Security

Jeltje de Nieuwenhoven wrote a report during her function as OV (public transport) ambassador called "The OV-chipcard, the Traveler and Confidence" which concluded that "many travelers are not very concerned about privacy; it's only an issue when the media makes an issue of it. However, a small amount privacy is important." De Winter found that these statements, other statements, and recommendations in this report were not substantiated, and so sent a WOB request in order to gain an understanding of the data on which these claims are based. De Nieuwenhoven rejected this application; De Winter presented this to court. The OV-chipcard/MIFARE uses 48-bit encryption and offers no modern security features.

Netherlands in Open Connection

During the program's Open Standards and Open Source Software, later as part of the Open Source Software Strategy (for the government), (OSOSS) (2002–2007) and its successor Netherlands in Open Connection (NOiV) (2008–2011), de Winter followed developments critically. It turned out that the House of Representatives did not follow its policy on the implementation by the IT departments of the government. De Winter issued a WOB request to the Dutch Association of Municipalities (VNG) to gain more insight into the performance. When the VNG refused to make the information public, de Winter filed a lawsuit, and later, WOB requests to all individual municipalities, provinces, and many independent administrative bodies. Winter was on 16 December 2009 at the presentation of the Book A wall of rubber in the WOB in journalistic practice for to criticism from the parliamentarian Pierre Heijnen (PvdA). This was criticised by the other attendees at the meeting, including former minister Bram Peper.

Criminal proceedings and dismissal

In 2011 de Winter was the subject of a criminal investigation. For uncovering weaknesses in the chip card and the central system, the Public Prosecutor assumed he was illegally cracking the cards. The company behind the chip card has reported. Winter by the Public Prosecutor considered suspicious for manipulating value cards, possession of means to do so, and computer intrusion. He faced imprisonment for up to six years. De Winter indicates that the manipulation was performed as part of the journalistic investigation into the weaknesses of the OV-chipcard expose and denounced the investigation.

In demonstrating the weaknesses were also journalists, among others, the NIS, the public broadcasting Powned, Computerworld, RTV Rijnmond was involved. They would not have reported been made. In order to pay the legal costs, NU.nl, Computerworld, PC-Active, and GeenStijl started a campaign to raise money. Within an hour, the necessary €2,500 was raised and the funds kept coming. The case dragged a while and, according to Winter, influence on his work. He now also being hindered in his work by the prosecution. The Dutch Association of Journalists supported de Winter in his case.

On 8 September, the prosecution announced that Brenno de Winter would not be prosecuted for fraud associated with the smartcard. The prosecutor noted that de Winter acted carefully and the limits of the permissible maxima were not exceeded. Moreover, in this case considered important in that de Winter, a professional journalist, exposed the vulnerability of the smartcard and was criminally investigated for fraud by the request of the corporation associated with the card.

== Publications ==
- (in Dutch) Computer! Total: Linux in practice, 2004, Addison Wesley, ISBN 9043009342
- (in Dutch) Privacy and the Internet: How do I protect my identity?, 2011, Academic Service, ISBN 9789012582414
- (in Dutch) Open Map, 2011, Academic Service, ISBN 9789052619071
