= Ella Vogelaar =

Dutch politician (1949–2019)

Her Excellency Ella Vogelaar
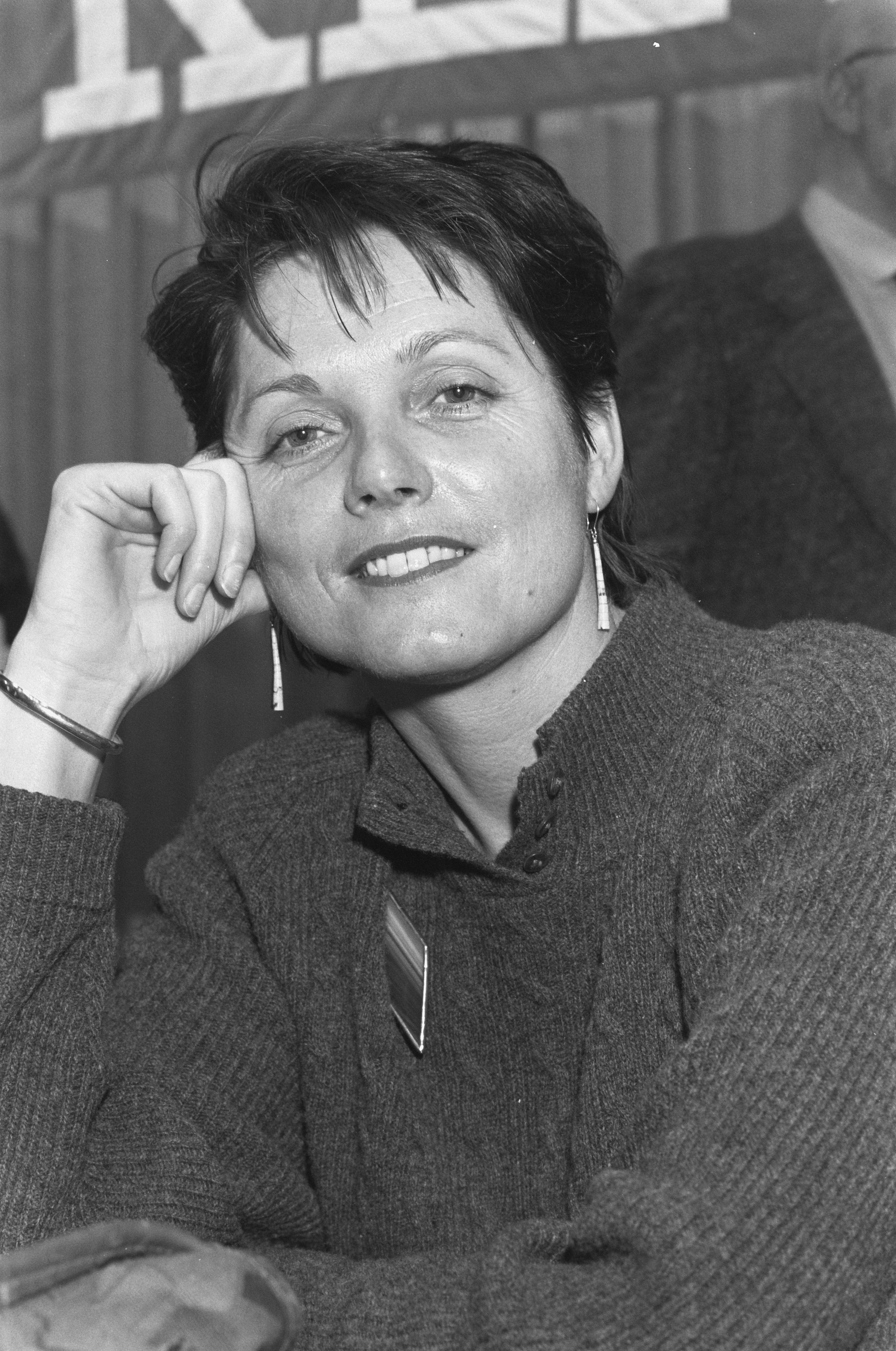
- Vogelaar in 1988

Minister for Housing, Communities and Integration
- In office 22 February 2007 – 14 November 2008
- Prime Minister: Jan Peter Balkenende
- Preceded by: Office established
- Succeeded by: Eberhard van der Laan

Personal details
- Born: Catharina Pieternella Vogelaar; 23 December 1949 Steenbergen, Netherlands
- Died: 7 October 2019 (aged 69) Utrecht, Netherlands
- Party: Labour Party (from 1986)
- Other political affiliations: Communist Party of the Netherlands (1974–1983)
- Education: University of Amsterdam (Bachelor of Education, Master of Education)
- Occupation: Politician, Civil servant, Trade Union leader, Corporate director, Nonprofit director, Social worker, Political pundit, Author

Catharina Pieternella "Ella" Vogelaar (23 December 1949 – 7 October 2019) was a Dutch politician of the Labour Party (PvdA) and trade union leader.

== Political career ==
After graduating from the HBS in Zierikzee she attended the social academy in Driebergen between 1967 and 1972. During that period, Vogelaar was an active member of the Communist Party of the Netherlands (CPN). In 1972 she began to work as a youth worker. In the mid 1980s she began to work for the Education Trade Union and she began to study education studies at the University of Amsterdam specialising in education policy and law. In 1987 she graduated from the University of Amsterdam and in 1988 she became chair of the Trade Union for Education. During her tenure as chair, she prepared the merger between the social-democratic ABOP education trade union and the liberal NGLOA education trade union. In 1994 she became vice-chair of the Federation Dutch Labour Movement, as such she was member of the Social Economic Council and the Foundation of Labour. Between 1997 and 2000 she was project manager at the Ministry of Social Affairs and Employment. Since 2000 Vogelaar worked as an independent advisor and interim-manager, as such she has coordinated the project Integration Task Force at the Ministry of the Interior and Kingdom Relations. She advised governments, organisations and companies on employment policy, social security, education and integration. She was also part of the board of VNO-NCW, the largest Dutch employers' federation.

She was part of the advisory board and the board of directors of several companies, including the Amsterdam Municipal Transport Agency, the Harbour of Rotterdam and Unilever. She served on the board of the Nederlands-Vlaamse Accreditatie Organisatie, which inspects the quality of Dutch and Flemish universities and on the board of the Dutch Center for Foreigners. From 2004 through 2007, she was chair of Oxfam Novib, the largest Dutch international development organization.

On 13 November 2008 she resigned as Minister of Integration and Housing after the party leadership removed their confidence for her position after increasing criticism of her media performance. An example of this was her performance in a video by the blog GeenStijl in which their reporter Rutger Castricum asked her critical questions about reports that she had hired a spin doctor.

== Death ==
On 7 October 2019, Vogelaar died at the age of 69. She committed suicide after struggling with depression.

== Decorations ==
Honours
Ribbon bar	Honour	Country	Date	Comment
	Officer of the Order of Orange-Nassau	Netherlands	3 December 2010	

Political offices
Preceded by Office established	Minister for Housing, Communities and Integration; 2007–2008	Succeeded by Eberhard van der Laan
