= Sanae Orchi =

Dutch model, presenter and journalist (b. 1989)

- Born: Sanae Orchi; November 16, 1989 (age 36) 's-Hertogenbosch, Netherlands
- Occupations: model, entrepreneur, presenter, reporter
- Years active: 2011 – present
- Known for: FunX, NTR, PowNed
- Website: http://www.sanaeorchi.com/

Sanae Orchi (born November 16, 1989, 's-Hertogenbosch) is a Dutch model, entrepreneur, presenter and journalist. She also has her own fashion brand.

== Early life ==
Orchi grew up in 's-Hertogenbosch. At age seventeen she started studying commercial economics.

== Career ==
She works as a model. During a beauty pageant interview she was discovered by an NTR journalist. By the end of 2011 she started working as a reporter for news program De Nieuwe Maan. She moved to FunX and was approached to host AT5 Ochtendnieuws.

One and a half years later Orchi started as a reporter for PowNews. In early 2015 she became a news presenter for NH. She creates and hosts a web series called Sanae Zoekt. In 2017 she presented the TV show Groeten uit Marokko for NTR.

That same year Orchi launched her own youth fashion brand, QIFESH that is sold by clothing shops throughout the Netherlands.
