= Paternotte =

Paternotte may refer to:

- Bas Paternotte, a Dutch political reporter
- Jean-Baptiste Paternotte, a French football player
- Yanick Paternotte, a member of the National Assembly of France
