= Jan Roos =

Jan Roos may refer to:

- Jan Roos (journalist) (born 1977), Dutch journalist
- Jan Roos (painter) (1591–1638), Flemish painter
