= Dominique Weesie =

Dutch journalist, founder of GeenStijl and PowNed

- Born: Dominicus Jacobus Weesie; 12 October 1969 (age 56); Rotterdam, Netherlands
- Other name: Fleischbaum
- Occupations: Journalist, broadcaster and presenter

Dominicus Jacobus "Dominique" Weesie (born 12 October 1969) is a Dutch journalist and founder of the weblog site GeenStijl and public broadcasting association PowNed.

== Biography ==
After finishing his HAVO education at the Krimpenerwaard College Weesie began studying at the School for Journalism in Utrecht in 1988, but he did not finish his studies. As an intern he worked at the Rotterdams Dagblad newspaper between 1991 and 1993. After 1991 he became a political reporter at the newspaper De Telegraaf and stayed in this position until 2006 when he began working full-time for GeenStijl.

== GeenStijl ==
In 2003 Weesie founded a weblog with De Telegraaf colleague Romke Spierdijk which evolved into the Geenstijl site. On the site he was known under his pseudonym Fleischbaum. Until 2009 he was general director and editor-in-chief of GeenStijl.

On 27 May 2009 it became known that Weesie was leaving GeenStijl.

On 26 January 2011 Weesie was named the Blogger of the Decade by the Dutch Bloggies foundation.

== PowNed ==
In 2009 Weesie founded the public broadcaster PowNed (Dutch: Publieke Omroep Weldenkend Nederland En Dergelijke) which got airtime on 6 September 2010. He is the chairman of PowNed and presents the actuality programme PowNews.

== Controversy ==
Weesie was criticized by online publication Joop.nl for allegedly having fabricated a controversial remark by an anti-Zwarte Piet demonstrator. This assertion was copied from Weesie and subsequently retracted by newspaper NRC Handelsblad.

== See also ==
- Dumpert
