= PowNed =

Dutch public broadcaster

- Type: Public broadcaster
- Country: Netherlands
- Availability: Netherlands
- Founded: 7 January 2009 by Dominique Weesie
- TV stations: NPO 3
- Radio stations: NPO Radio 1 NPO 3FM
- Official website: powned.tv

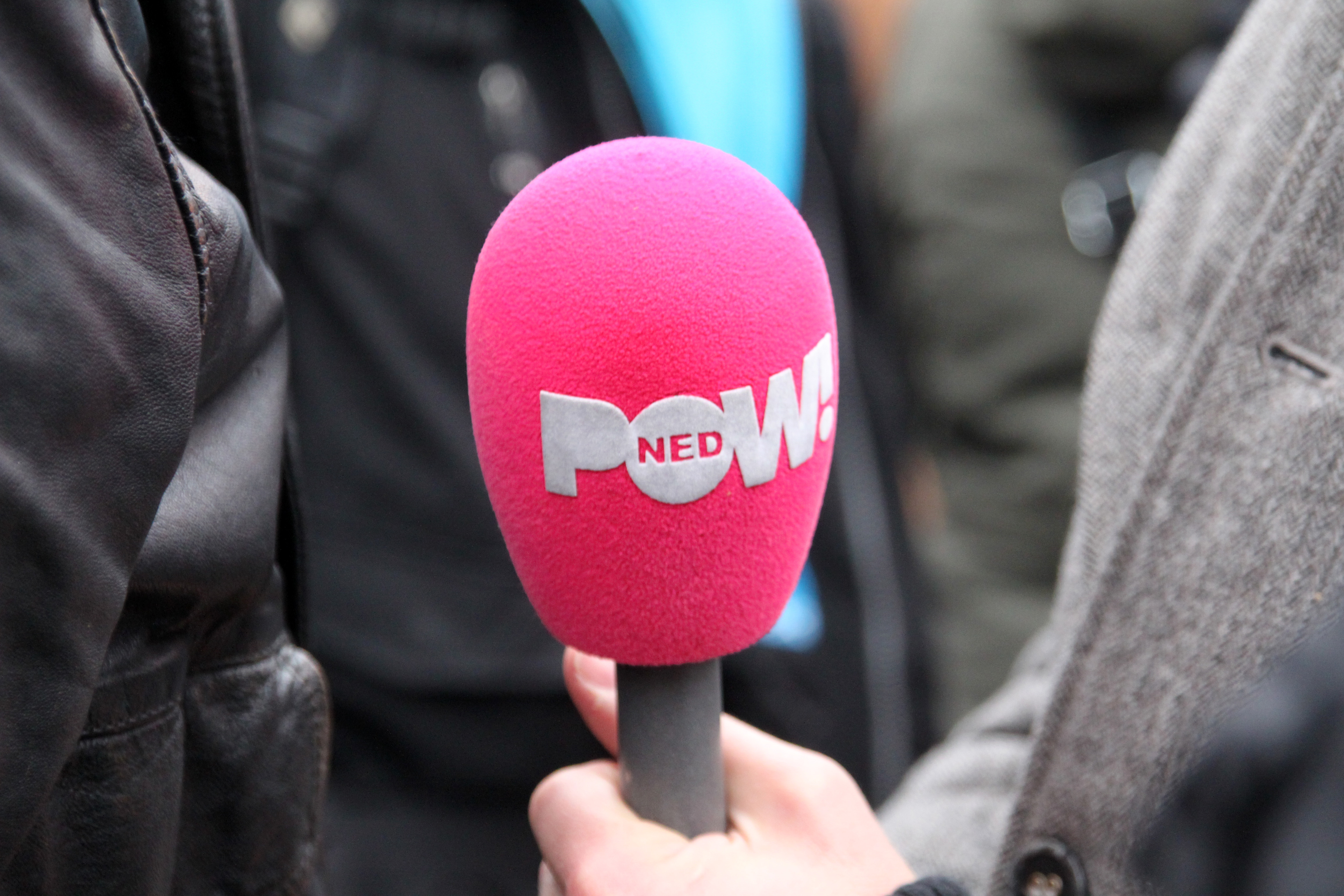
The signature pink microphone cover of PowNed, with their former logo used from 2009 till 2019

PowNed is a Dutch broadcaster, which transmits radio and television programmes on the Netherlands Public Broadcasting system.

Each weekday evening it airs a satirical news show called PowNews on Nederland 3, in which politicians and other public and non-public figures are confronted with provocative questions, and often ridiculed.

The broadcaster was affiliated with and was started up with the help of the popular GeenStijl shock blog.

The director of PowNed is Dominique Weesie (who also presents PowNews) and their star reporter is Rutger Castricum. Other reporters include(d) Jojanneke van den Berge, Jan Roos (also presenter of the radio programme Echte Jannen with Jan Dijkgraaf) and Daan Nieber. Several other people involved with PowNed programmes (radio and television) are DJs Rob Stenders and Bert van Lent, sports presenters Henk Spaan and Hugo Borst (of the TV football programme Heilig Gras), Bas Paternotte (political commentator for Echte Jannen) and Brenno de Winter (ICT commentator for PowNews).

The name is a backronym for Publieke Omroep Weldenkend Nederland En Dergelijke (English: Public broadcaster (for the) well-thinking Netherlands and the like). PowNed claims to serve the network generation and argues heavily (in a tongue-in-cheek style) against baby boomers whom it sees as clinging on to power.

== Presenters ==
=== Television ===
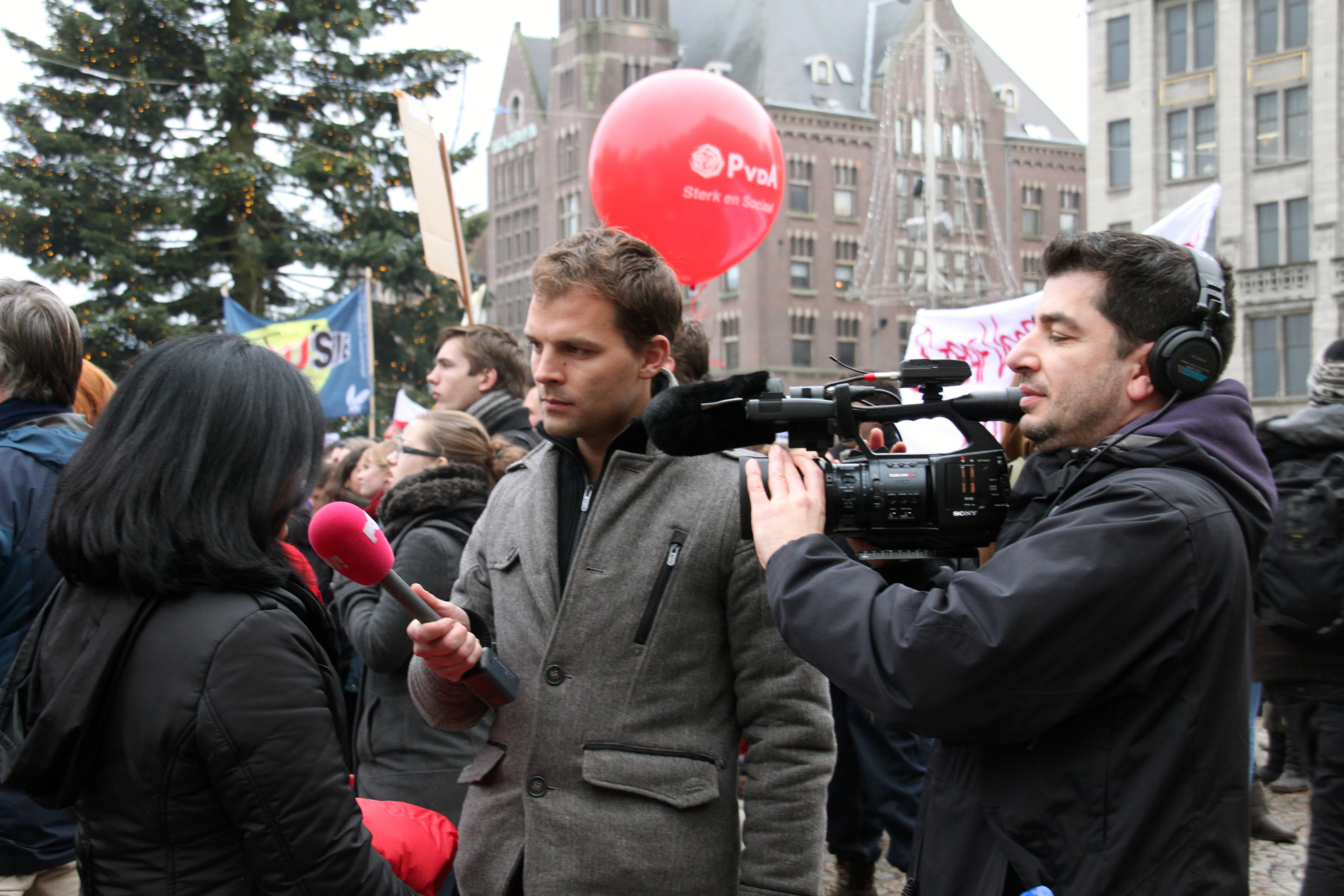
Daan Nieber

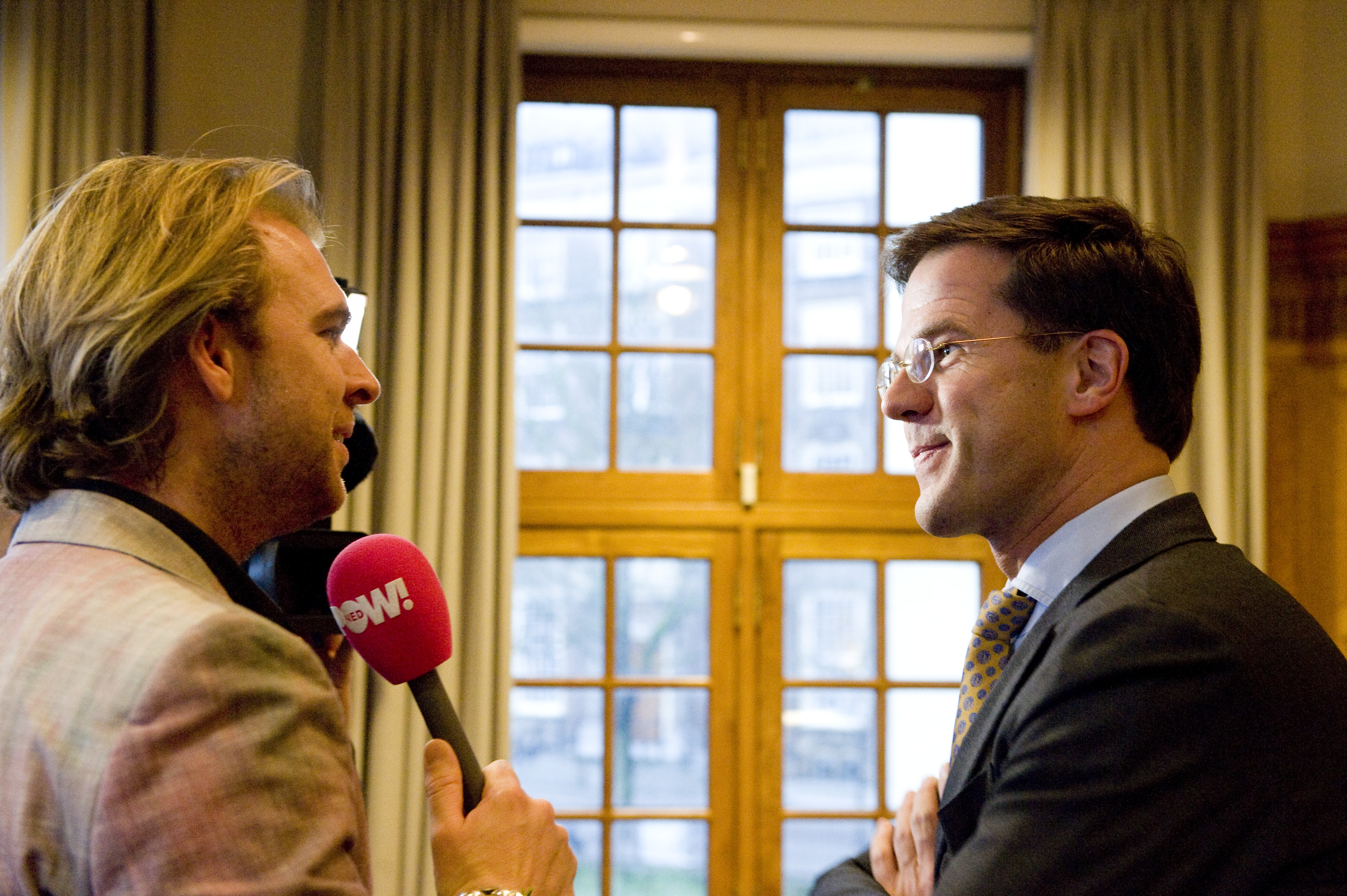
Rutger Castricum and Mark Rutte

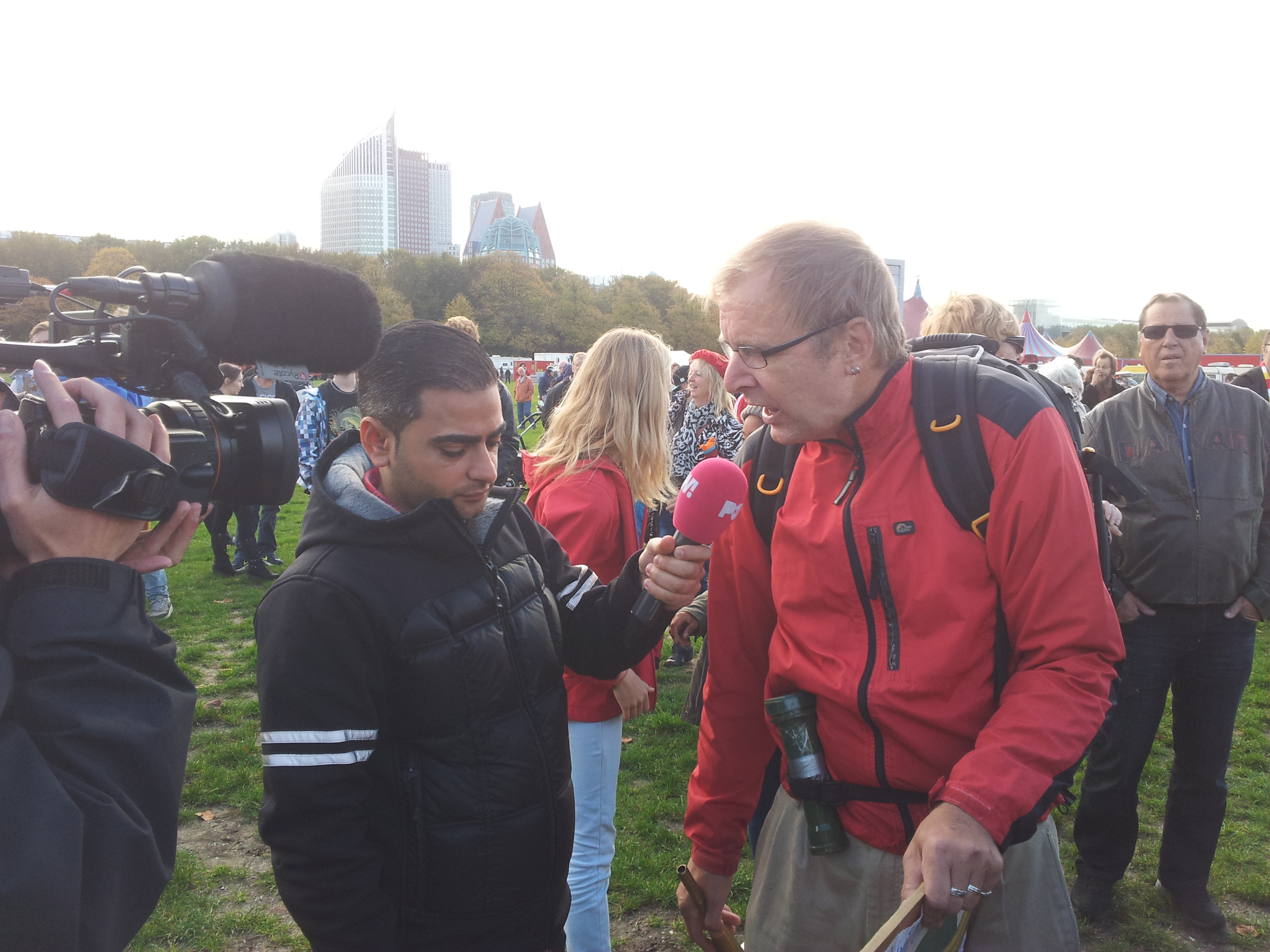
Danny Ghosen

| Presenter | Season | | | | |
| Presenter | 1 | 2 | 3 | 4 | 5 |
|---|---|---|---|---|---|
| Rutger Castricum | | | | | |
| Jan Roos | | | | | |
| Jojanneke van den Berge | | | | | |
| Daan Nieber | | | | | |
| Danny Ghosen | | | | | |
| Jan Versteegh | | | | | |
| Nadia Poeschmann | | | | | |
| Gerben van Driel | | | | | |
| Tom Staal | | | | | |
| Bram Endedijk | | | | | |
| Jeroen Holtrop | | | | | |
| Roel Maalderink | | | | | |
| Sanae Orchi | | | | | |

=== Radio ===
- Jan Dijkgraaf (September 2010 – September 2011)
- Jan Heemskerk (September 2011 – June 2015)
- Jeroen Kijk in de Vegte (June 2012 – present)
- Frank van der Lende (January 2014 – January 2015)
- Jasper Leijdens (January 2015 – present)
- Mark van der Molen (February 2015 – present)
- Ingrid Perez (September 2012 – January 2014)
- Jan Roos (September 2010 – June 2015)
- Rob Stenders (September 2010 – July 2015)
- Saskia Weerstand (January 2015 – February 2015)

== Programs ==
=== Television ===
==== Heilig Gras ====
Episodes:

| # | Date | Guest | Viewers |
|---|---|---|---|
| 1 | 8 April 2011 | Robin van Persie | 279.000 |
| 2 | 15 April 2011 | Nike | 222.000 |
| 3 | 22 April 2011 | Parents and children | 145.000 |
| 4 | 29 April 2011 | Football stats | 157.000 |
| 5 | 6 May 2011 | ADO Den Haag | 201.000 |
| 6 | 13 May 2011 | Frank de Boer | 268.000 |

==== House Ibiza ====
In House Ibiza went Rutger Castricum and Dominique Weesie to Ibiza and interviewed guests.

Episodes:

| # | Guest |
|---|---|
| 1 | Ronald Plasterk; Barbara Barend; Guido Weijers; Ursul de Geer |
| 2 | John van den Heuvel; Fajah Lourens; Jokertje from Oh Oh Cherso... |
| 3 | Hero Brinkman; Jan Slagter; Amanda Krabbé |
| 4 | Peter R. de Vries; Sander de Kramer; Tygo Gernandt |
| 5 | Boris van der Ham; Goedele Liekens; Jan-Hein Kuijpers; Bas van Toor |
| 6 | Michael Boogerd; Jeanine Hennis-Plasschaert; René Froger |

==== PowLitie ====
In PowLitie went Danny Ghosen (S1-3), Thijs Zeeman (S1-3) Jojanneke van den Berge (S1-2) Daan Nieber (S1-2) Roel Maalderink (S3) on criminal. The first season was part of Zendtijd PowNed.

Presenters:

| Presenter | Season 1 | Season 2 | Season 3 |
|---|---|---|---|
| Danny Ghosen | | | |
| Thijs Zeeman | | | |
| Jojanneke van den Berge | | | |
| Daan Nieber | | | |
| Roel Maalderink | | | |

==== Studio PowNed ====
Studio PowNed is a late night talkshow presented by Rutger Castricum. Guests are Dominique Weesie, Erik de Vlieger, Thierry Baudet, Yoeri Albrecht. In the program are news and politics, there are reportages from Jan Roos, Tom Staal and others.

==== Zendtijd PowNed ====
In Zendtijd PowNed the presenters of PowNed watched if a new program is successful.

Episodes:

| # | Date | Viewers | Program | Came later on television or radio |
|---|---|---|---|---|
| 1 | 25 February 2012 | 167.000 | Fill! | No |
| 2 | 3 March 2012 | 105.000 | Drive along | No |
| 3 | 10 March 2012 | 130.000 | Echte Jannen | Yes, on radio |
| 4 | 17 March 2012 | 129.000 | Echte Jannen | Yes, on radio |
| 5 | 24 March 2012 | 270.000 | PowLitie | Yes, on television |
| 6 | 31 March 2012 | 152.000 | PowLitie | Yes, on television |
| 7 | 7 April 2012 | 179.000 | PowLitie | Yes, on television |
| 8 | 14 April 2012 | 143.000 | PowNews XL | No |
| 9 | 21 April 2012 | 182.000 | PowNews XL | No |

==== Others ====
- Camping PowNed (2013)
- Captain Henk (2017)
- Dat zijn geen grappen (2018–present)
- De Hofbar (2018–present)
- De Hofkar (2019–present)
- De week van PowNed (September – December 2016)
- Emmen op 1 (2018)
- Marokko op 1 (2018)
- Niet Lullen Maar Poetsen (November 2015 – present)
- PowNed (television program) (2009)
- PowNews Flits (January 2017 – present)
- Weg met de buren (2018)

=== Radio ===
- De Bende van Van der Lende (January 2014 – December 2014)
- Echte Jannen (September 2010 – June 2015)
- Halve Soul (June 2012 – December 2013)
- Jasper (January 2015 – May 2015)
- Nog/al Wakker (February 2015 – May 2015)
- RobRadio (September 2010 – July 2015)
- Saskia (January 2015 – February 2015)
- Stenders Late Vermaak (September 2010 – July 2015)
- Vroeg of Laat Pérez (September 2012 – January 2014)
- Bij Gebrek aan Beter (July – October 2015)
- De diepte in door de bril van Joost Eerdmans (December 2018 – present)
- License to Chill (2013 – December 2015)
- Marktplaats (June 2015 – December 2015)
- Opvliegers (October 2015 – January 2016)
- RickvanV doet 2 (November 2018 – present)
- Rob Standards (January 2015 – August 2015)
- Turbulent (September 2010 – August 2012)
- Zwarte Prietpraat (January 2016 – present)
