= GeenPeil =

- Available in: Dutch
- Owners: News Media (NL), Burgercomité-EU
- Website: www.geenpeil.nl
- Registration: Netherlands
- Launched: 2014

GeenPeil (Dutch "no poll") is a political initiative by GeenStijl ("no style" or "without style"), a Dutch weblog and political party known for its provocative content and its past hoaxes. The name refers to polling results.

== First initiative 2014 ==
GeenStijl organized its first GeenPeil initiative during the 2014 European Parliament elections which were held between 22 and 25 May 2014 within the European Union. Being among the first to vote on May 22, Dutch municipalities were not allowed to publish the results of the election before those of the other EU members were known.

Because the Dutch Electoral Act states that the chairman of every polling station has to read the electoral results out loud, if requested to do so, GeenStijl found 1,442 volunteers willing to register and call-in the results of nearly every polling station within the country. Based on those results, GeenStijl was able to construct and publish its own exit poll in the early morning of 23 May 2014, several days before the last election results became public.

== Second initiative 2015 ==
GeenPeil gained further publicity in 2015 by calling for an advisory referendum on the Ukraine–European Union Association Agreement. The call for this referendum was supported by several Dutch political parties, including the PVV, Groep Bontes/Van Klaveren, SP, 50PLUS and PvdD. Opposing voices to the referendum stated that the subject was unsuitable for a 'substantive public discussion'; former minister of Economic Affairs Laurens Jan Brinkhorst said that in reality the referendum is not about the association agreement, but really is a "defining tool for either opposing or siding with Putin".

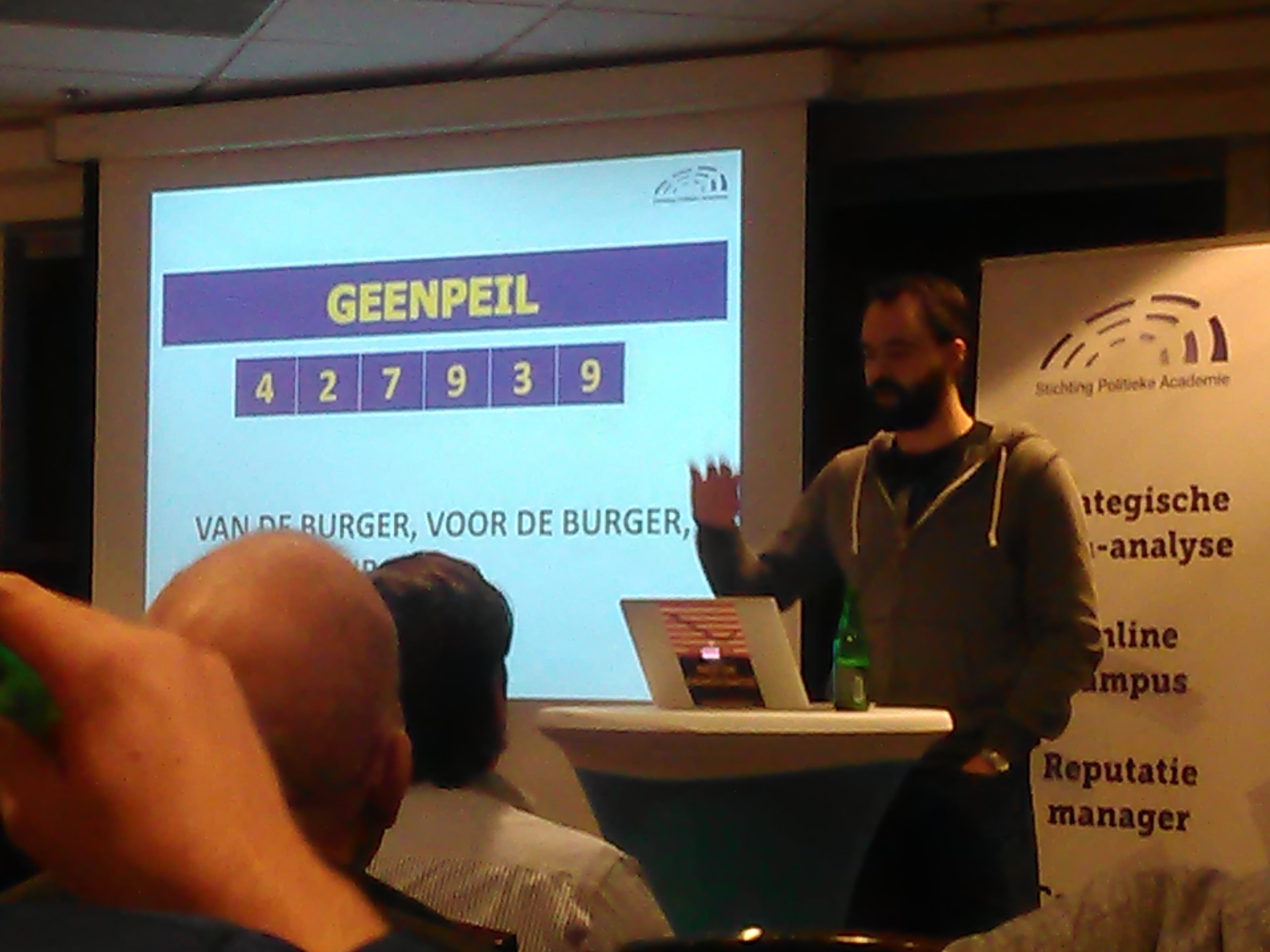

On 29 October 2015, the Dutch Electoral Council announced all legal stipulations had been met and the referendum would be held on 6 April 2016.

This latest GeenPeil campaign was headed by GeenStijl reporter Jan Roos, who later announced GeenPeil will not engage in any political campaigns aimed against or for the Ukraine agreement. Instead, priority will be given to the minimum participation quorum of 30%, as stipulated in the Dutch Advisory Referendum act. If the quorum is not met, the referendum will be ruled invalid.

=== Referendum budget ===
The Dutch Ministry of Internal Affairs decided on establishing a budget of 20 million euros to finance the GeenPeil referendum, less than half the amount reserved for the 2012 national Parliamentary elections. According to the Association of Netherlands Municipalities VNG, this budget would have a negative effect on the democratic electoral process.

In an effort to increase the financial means for municipalities as well as safeguard the democratic process, on 3 December 2015 a motion was put forward by D66-politician Fatma Koşer Kaya and SP-politician Ronald van Raak to increase the budget to 42 million euros. The motion was opposed by majority – consisting of VVD, PvdA, CDA, SGP and CU – and therefore not adopted.

The GeenPeil campaign team considered the failed motion to be 'the last straw' in a series of incidents and decided to invoke the aid of the Office for Democratic Institutions and Human Rights (ODIHR), the principal institution of the OSCE that same day. A letter from GeenPeil, sent to the ODIHR office in Warsaw, formally requested an 'ODIHR Election Observation Mission' to be sent to the Netherlands as soon as possible, not only to supervise the referendum itself on 6 April 2016, but also to analyze the perceived 'political obstruction' which GeenPeil felt was intended to cause the referendum to fail.

=== Effects of the reduced budget ===
The GeenPeil campaign set out to investigate whether the reduced budget would influence the number of polling stations each municipality would open for the GeenPeil referendum. On 13 December 2015, over 40 municipalities (out of a total of 396) indicated they were planning to tentatively or definitely reduce the number of polling stations. Although in some cases the reduction only concerned one polling station, in other cases over 50% of the standard polling stations for elections are to remain closed for this referendum. Multiple reasons – including a lower budget – were given for the decisions. On 15 December 2015, the municipality Oldenzaal based the decision to reduce the standard 17 polling stations with 70% to just 5 stations on 'budgetary reasons'.

Shortly after these results were made public, several municipalities – pressured by either local council members or the public – reverted to the standard number of polling stations. By mid December, only 5 out of the total of 396 municipalities had not answered the questions regarding the number of polling stations, posted by GeenPeil in early November. Despite continued efforts, these municipalities – Alphen-Chaam, Kerkrade, Sint Anthonis and Sittard-Geleen – refused to communicate their intentions.

=== Governmental support ===
On 25 November 2015, a majority of the House of Representatives stated they would respect the results of the advisory GeenPeil referendum, even though most parties preferred the Ukraine Association Agreement to be ratified. Less than a month later, however, on 15 December 2015, a motion proposed by House of Representatives member Louis Bontes to respect the results of the GeenPeil referendum was voted down.

=== Support for Brexit ===
GeenPeil supported the Brexit-campaign of UKIP. Jan Roos was present with UKIP leader Nigel Farage at the so-called "Battle of the Thames", a maritime confrontation on the Thames between Leave and Remain supporters prior to the Brexit-referendum.

== Political party ==
GeenPeil became a political party on 5 December 2016 and took part in the Dutch general elections on 15 March 2017 with Jan Dijkgraaf as "lijsttrekker" (lead candidate). They did not get enough votes for a seat in parliament.

Forum for Democracy, which was also involved in the Ukraine referendum did get two seats in the elections.
