= Fedde Schurer =

Dutch schoolteacher, journalist, language activist and politician

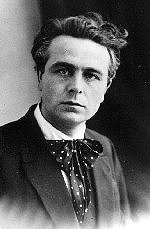
- Born: 25 July 1898; Drachten, Netherlands
- Died: 19 March 1968 (aged 69); Heerenveen, Netherlands
- Citizenship: Dutch
- Occupations: poet, writer (also school-teacher, journalist and politician)
- Spouse: Willemke de Vries
- Children: Andries Schurer (adopted)
- Writing career
- Language: West Frisian
- Years active: 1920–1968
- Period: 20th century
- Genres: poetry, short stories, drama
- Notable works: Fersen; Simson

Fedde Schurer (West Frisian: [ˈfɛrə ˈskyːrər], Dutch: [ˈfɛdə ˈsxyːrər]; 25 July 1898 – 19 March 1968) was a Dutch schoolteacher, journalist, language activist and politician, and one of the most influential poets in the West Frisian language of the 20th century.

== Life and career ==
=== Early life ===
From 1904 on, Schurer grew up in the Frisian fishing village of Lemmer, and from a young age worked as a carpenter. Through self-education in the evenings he studied to become a schoolteacher, and in 1919, he was appointed in that position to the local Christian elementary school in Lemmer. His wife Willemke "Willy" de Vries, who was also a schoolteacher, and his colleague at this school, he had actually met when he was still a carpenter's apprentice, as she was the girl who delivered the newspaper at the carpenter's workshop every day. Schurer and Willy were married on 1 July 1924.

=== Amsterdam years ===
In 1930, his openly pacifist stance caused Schurer to lose his job, after which he moved to Amsterdam, where he was appointed to a state-run school. He was a talented orator, and his pacifist and socialist views were seen as a danger to society at that time, which is why the BVD, the Dutch secret service, started a file om him. Schurer joined the Christian-Democratic Union (CDU), a Christian-socialist splinter party, and in 1935–1936 he served as a member of the provincial assembly of North Holland for a year. In World War II he was involved with the Dutch resistance in Amsterdam, where his house was used as a temporary hiding place for people wanted by the Nazis, before they could be smuggled out of the city.

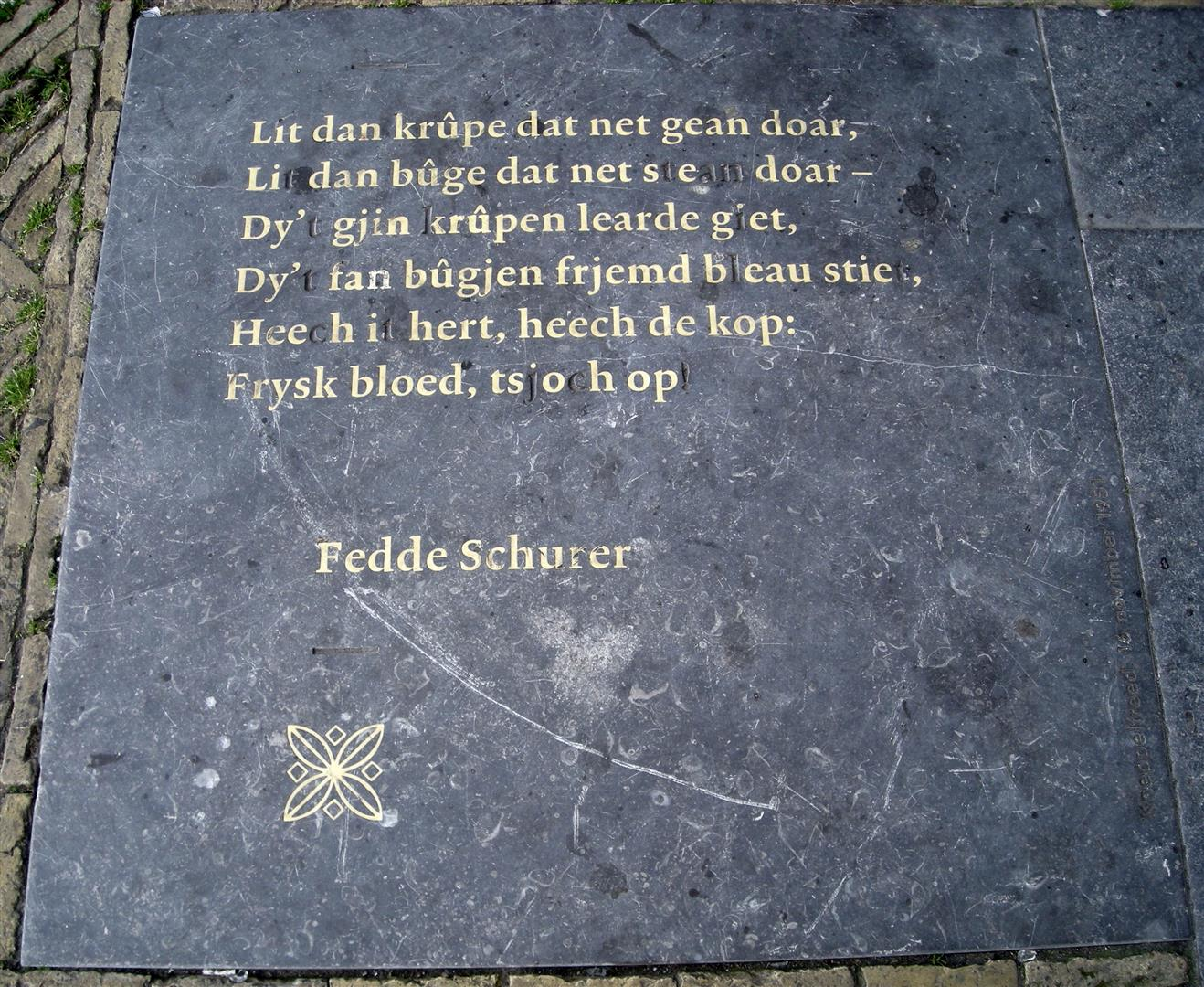
Memorial of Kneppelfreed with a poem by Fedde Schurer in front of the Courthouse in Leeuwarden

=== Kneppelfreed ===
After the war, Schurer returned to Friesland, where he lived in Heerenveen, and worked as a journalist. Like most people from Friesland, he was a native West Frisian speaker, and from a young age he had been an ardent supporter of his mother tongue. In 1950 and 1951, in several court cases in Friesland the judge denied the defendants the right to speak Frisian, Schurer wrote a sharply worded editorial rebuke in the Heerenveensche Koerier newspaper. The Honourable Sacco Richard Wolthers had said during the court session of 17 October 1951, "Officieel versta ik u niet" (Officially I can't understand you). Schurer closed the editorial stating that civil servants ought to learn Frisian as recommended by the decentralisation commission. In a follow-up piece the next day, Schurer lectured the judge on a defendant's rights, and called Mr. Wolthers' behavior childish, offensive and harassing. He was then charged with slandering the judge, and had to appear in court on Friday, 16 November 1951, in the provincial capital of Leeuwarden, together with another journalist, Tsjebbe de Jong, of the Bolswarder Nieuwsblad who used the term "nazi methods" in his column about the case.

On the Zaailand square, in front of the Leeuwarden Palace of Justice, a large crowd gathered that day. There were some supporters of Schurer (among them renowned Frisian authors like Douwe Tamminga, Anne Wadman and Eeltsje Boates Folkertsma), some Frisian nationalists, members of the Frisian-language press (who were not allowed in the court-room) and a group of students carrying placards, but it happened to be market day that day, and a lot of the people there were simply market goers who came over to see what all the fuss was about. Through inept crowd control by the police the situation got completely out of hand and turned into a riot in which the police used excessive force known as Kneppelfreed ("Baton Friday", after the batons used by the police).

Something like this was unheard of in sleepy Dutch post-war society, and the event triggered angry protest meetings throughout Friesland. The story even made headlines in the foreign press, and questions were raised in the Tweede Kamer, the Dutch lower house of parliament. Under pressure to resolve the situation, the national government in The Hague sent a committee consisting of three ministers to Friesland to confer with the Frisian leaders, which eventually led to changes in the national laws (in 1955 and 1956), making it possible for Frisians to speak their own language in the court of law and giving the Frisian language in the Province of Friesland the official status of tweede rijkstaal ("second national language"). Kneppelfreed is considered one of the most important milestones in the emancipation of the West Frisian language.

As for Schurer, he lost his case, and was sentenced to a conditional prison sentence of 14 days and a fine of ƒ150.- (€558.65 in 2018) Schurer appealed the sentence, but lost and was finally sentenced to 30 days conditional and a fine of ƒ150.-.

=== Later years ===
Schurer served from 1956 to 1963 as a member of the Dutch national parliament for the Dutch Labour Party. He also continued to win acclaim as a poet. In fact, although Schurer is known as both a writer and a poet, his body of prose, consisting only of the short story collection Beam en Bast (1963) and his posthumously published autobiography De Besleine Spegel (1969), is diminutive when compared to his poetry oeuvre. Schurer also wrote two plays, Simson (1945, about the Biblical figure of Samson), and Bonifatius (1954, about Saint Boniface). Active also as a translator, he was responsible for the Frisian text of the Book of Esther in the New Frisian Bible Translation, while in 1931 he published a collection of poetry written by Heinrich Heine, which he had translated into Frisian. Fedde Schurer died in Heerenveen, in 1968, and was survived by his wife and their adopted son Andries. In 2010, the first comprehensive biography on Schurer was published, titled Fedde Schurer (1898–1968): Biografie van een Friese Koerier, written in Dutch by Johanneke Liemburg, the mayor of Littenseradiel.

== Bibliography ==
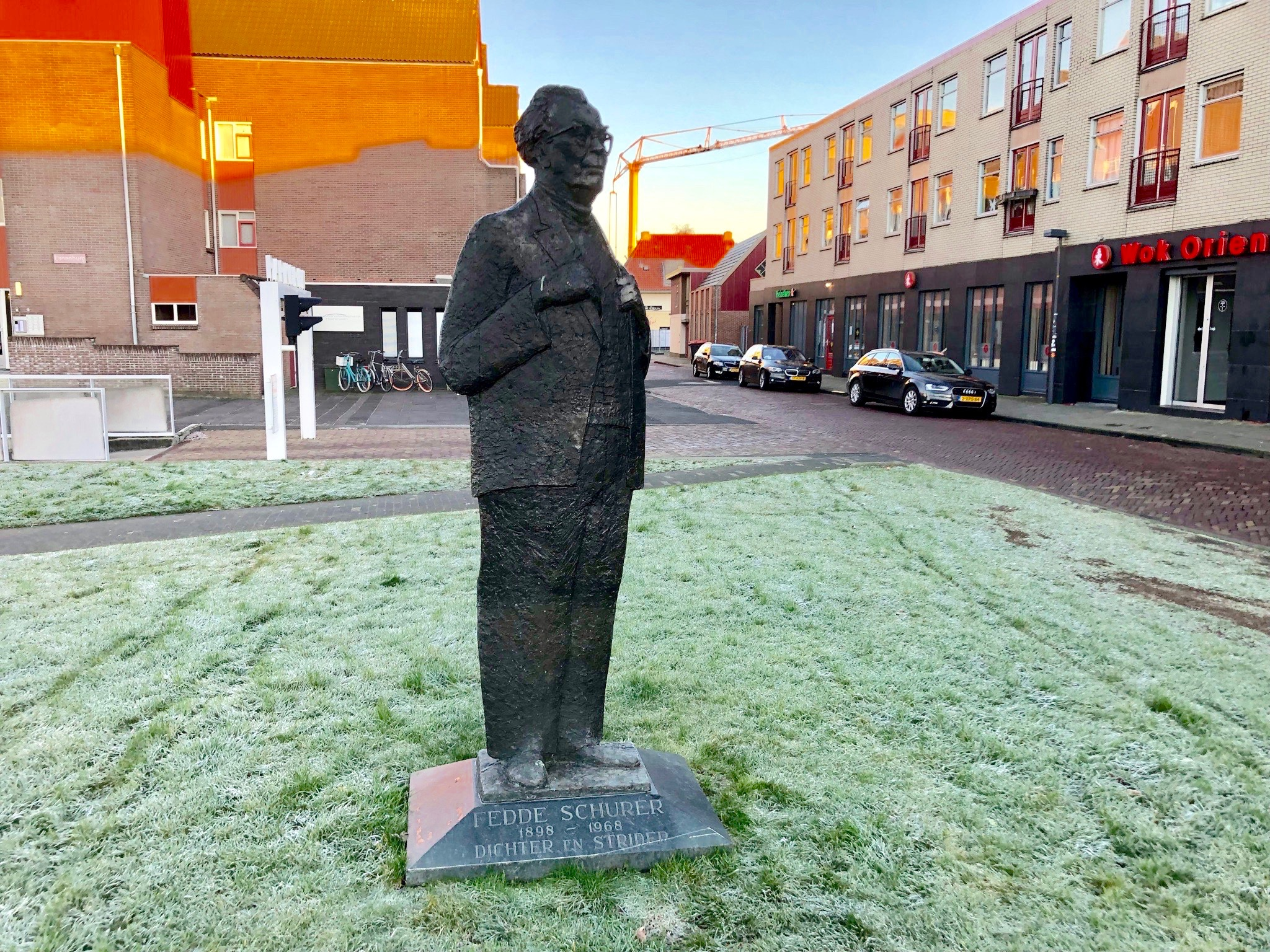
The statue of Fedde Schurer in Heerenveen.

=== Poetry ===
- 1925 – Fersen ("Poems")
- 1931 – Utflecht ("First Flight")
- 1936 – Op Alle Winen ("On Every Wind")
- 1940 – Fen Twa Wâllen ("Not Choosing One over the Other")
- 1947 – It Boek fan de Psalmen ("The Book of Psalms" – not a translation)
- 1949 – Vox Humana
- 1955 – Frysk Psalm- en Gesangboek ("Frisian Book of Psalms and Songs", rhymed version in Frisian of the Dutch liturgical songbook)
- 1955 – Fingerprinten ("Fingerprints")
- 1966 – Efter it Nijs ("Behind the News")
- 1966 – Opheind en Trochjown ("Caught and Passed On")
- 1966 – De Gitaer by it Boek, part 1 ("The Guitar by the Book")
- 1969 – De Gitaer by it Boek, part 2
- 1974 – Samle Fersen ("Collected Poetry", republished in 1975)

=== Prose ===
- 1963 – Beam en Bast ("Tree and Bark", short story collection)
- 1963 – Brood op het Water ("Bread on the Water", collection of Schurer's editorials in the Friese Koerier newspaper, partly in Dutch)
- 1969 – De Besleine Spegel ("The Blurred Mirror", unfinished autobiography, republished in 1998 and 2010)

=== Drama ===
- 1945 – Simson ("Samson", Biblical tragedy)
- 1954 – Bonifatius ("Saint Boniface", historical tragedy)

=== Translations ===
- 1931 – Heinrich Heine: Oersettings út Syn Dichtwirk ("Heinrich Heine: Translations from His Poetry")
- 1966 – Book of Esther (translation for the New Frisian Bible Translation)

== Sources ==
- Boomsma, Peter R., Kneppelfreed, Franeker (Uitgeverij Van Wijnen), 1998, ISBN 9 05 19 41 838
- Dykstra, Klaes, and Bouke Oldenhof, Lyts Hânboek fan de Fryske Literatuer, Leeuwarden (Afûk), 1997, ISBN 9 07 00 10 526, pp. 92–95
- Liemburg, Johanneke, Fedde Schurer (1898–1968): Biografie van een Friese Koerier, Leeuwarden (Friese Pers/Noordboek), 2010, ISBN 978-9 03 30 08 689
- Schurer, Fedde, De Besleine Spegel, Amsterdam (Moussault's Uitgeverij N.V.), 1969 (autobiography)
- Steenmeijer-Wielenga, Tineke, Fedde Schurer, in the Biografisch Woordenboek van het Socialisme en de Arbeidersbeweging in Nederland (BWSA), 1987, pp. 146–148
