= Eberhard van der Laan =

Dutch politician

His Excellency Eberhard van der Laan
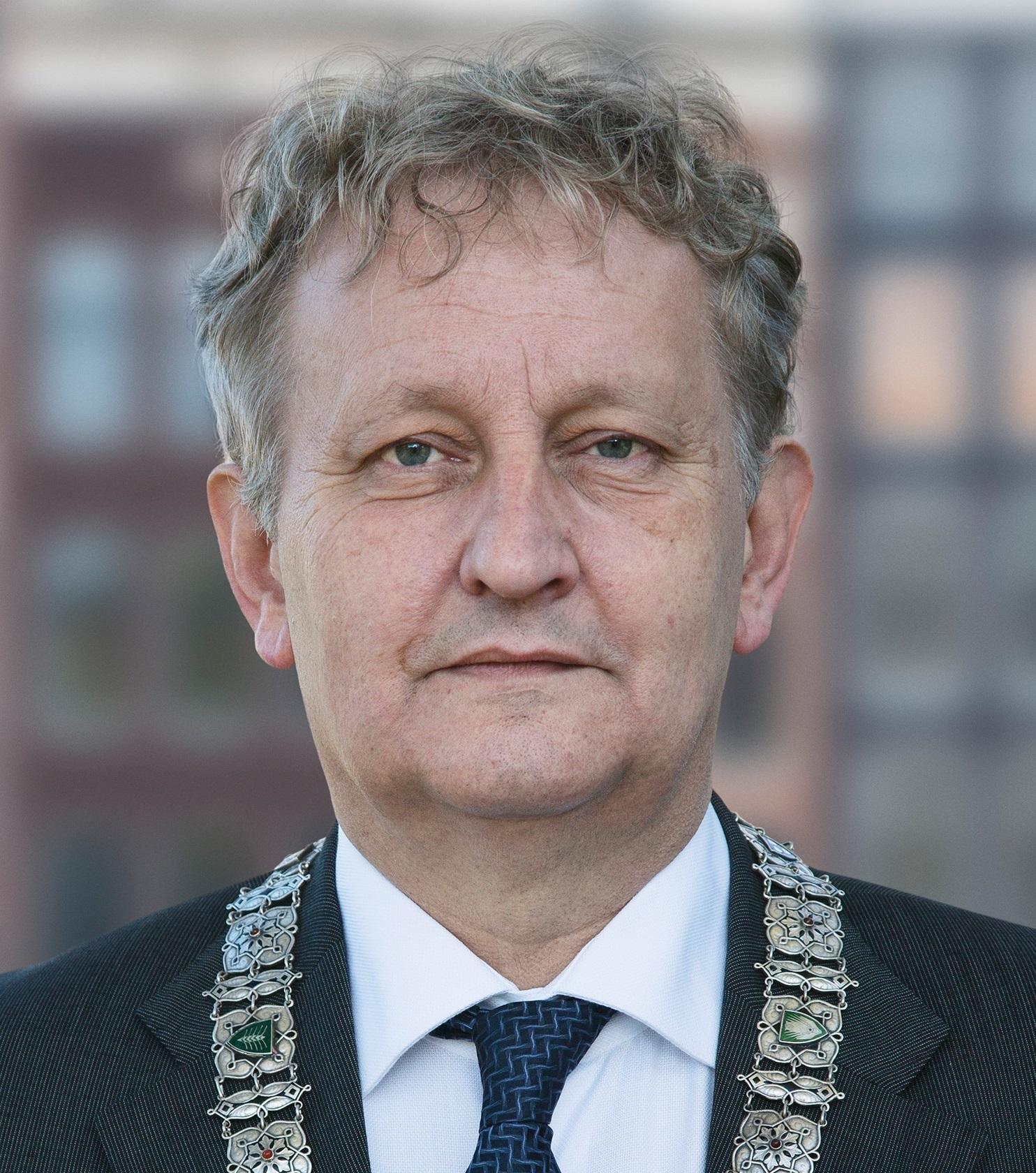
- Van der Laan in 2010

Mayor of Amsterdam
- In office 7 July 2010 – 5 October 2017
- Preceded by: Lodewijk Asscher (Acting)
- Succeeded by: Kajsa Ollongren (Ad interim)

Minister for Housing, Communities and Integration
- In office 14 November 2008 – 23 February 2010
- Prime Minister: Jan Peter Balkenende
- Preceded by: Ella Vogelaar
- Succeeded by: Eimert van Middelkoop

Personal details
- Born: Eberhard Edzard van der Laan; 28 June 1955 Leiden, Netherlands
- Died: 5 October 2017 (aged 62) Amsterdam, Netherlands
- Cause of death: Lung cancer
- Party: Labour Party (PvdA)
- Spouses: Luit Tabak (m. 1988; div. 2000) Femke van der Laan (m. 2005)
- Children: Two children (first marriage); Three children (second marriage)
- Education: Vrije Universiteit Amsterdam (Bachelor and Master of Laws)
- Occupation: Politician; jurist; lawyer; political consultant

Eberhard Edzard van der Laan (Dutch pronunciation: [ˈeːbərɦɑrt ˈɛtsɑrt fɑn dər ˈlaːn]; 28 June 1955 – 5 October 2017) was a Dutch politician who served as Minister for Housing, Communities and Integration from 2008 to 2010 and Mayor of Amsterdam from 2010 until his death in 2017. He was a member of the Labour Party (PvdA).

Van der Laan, a lawyer by occupation, worked for the Trenité Van Doorne Advocaten law firm from 1982 until 1992 when he co-founded the Kennedy Van der Laan law firm and served as a partner until 2008. After Ella Vogelaar—Minister for Housing, Communities and Integration in the Fourth Balkenende cabinet—resigned because the Leader of the PvdA Wouter Bos lost his confidence in her position after increasing criticism on her performance, Van der Laan was asked to succeed her and took office on 14 November 2008. The Fourth Balkenende cabinet fell on 23 February 2010 as the result of disagreement between the Christian Democratic Appeal (CDA) and the PvdA over the extension of ISAF mission in Afghanistan.

On 27 January 2017, it was revealed that Van der Laan had terminal lung cancer. On 18 September 2017, he published a letter entitled "Dear Amsterdammers", in which he revealed that all options of treatment had been exhausted and that with immediate effect he would take a leave of absence and the mayoral tasks would be taken up by Kajsa Ollongren. He died seventeen days later.

== Early life ==
Van der Laan was born in Rijnsburg, a small town nearby Leiden. Van der Laan graduated in 1983 cum laude in law at the Vrije Universiteit Amsterdam. He co-founded the law firm of Kennedy-Van der Laan.

== Politics ==
=== Local politics ===
Van der Laan began his political career as assistant to Amsterdam alderman Jan Schaefer. From 1990-98 he was a member of the Amsterdam municipal council, from 1993 as the chair of the PvdA group. After leaving politics he became a full-time lawyer.

=== National politics ===
In 2006 he was informateur in the negotiations of the new Amsterdam college van burgemeester en wethouders. In the local elections, politicians were criticised by Van der Laan for distributing election leaflets in minority languages and in some cases leaflets were collected. On 14 November 2008, he succeeded Ella Vogelaar as Minister for Housing, Communities and Integration in the Fourth cabinet Balkenende. On 23 June 2010, he was nominated by the Amsterdam municipal council to become Mayor of Amsterdam; the nomination was accepted by the King's Commissioner of North Holland.

== Death ==
On 27 January 2017, it was revealed that Van der Laan had metastatic lung cancer. He died on 5 October 2017 from this disease at the age of 62.

== Decorations ==
Honours
Ribbon bar	Honour	Country	Date	Comment
	Officer of the Order of Orange-Nassau	Netherlands	3 December 2010	

Political offices
Preceded by Ella Vogelaar	Minister for Housing, Communities and Integration; 2008–2010	Succeeded by Eimert van Middelkoop
Preceded by Lodewijk Asscher; Acting	Mayor of Amsterdam; 2010–2017	Succeeded by Kajsa Ollongren; Ad interim
