= Jan Roos (journalist) =

Dutch journalist

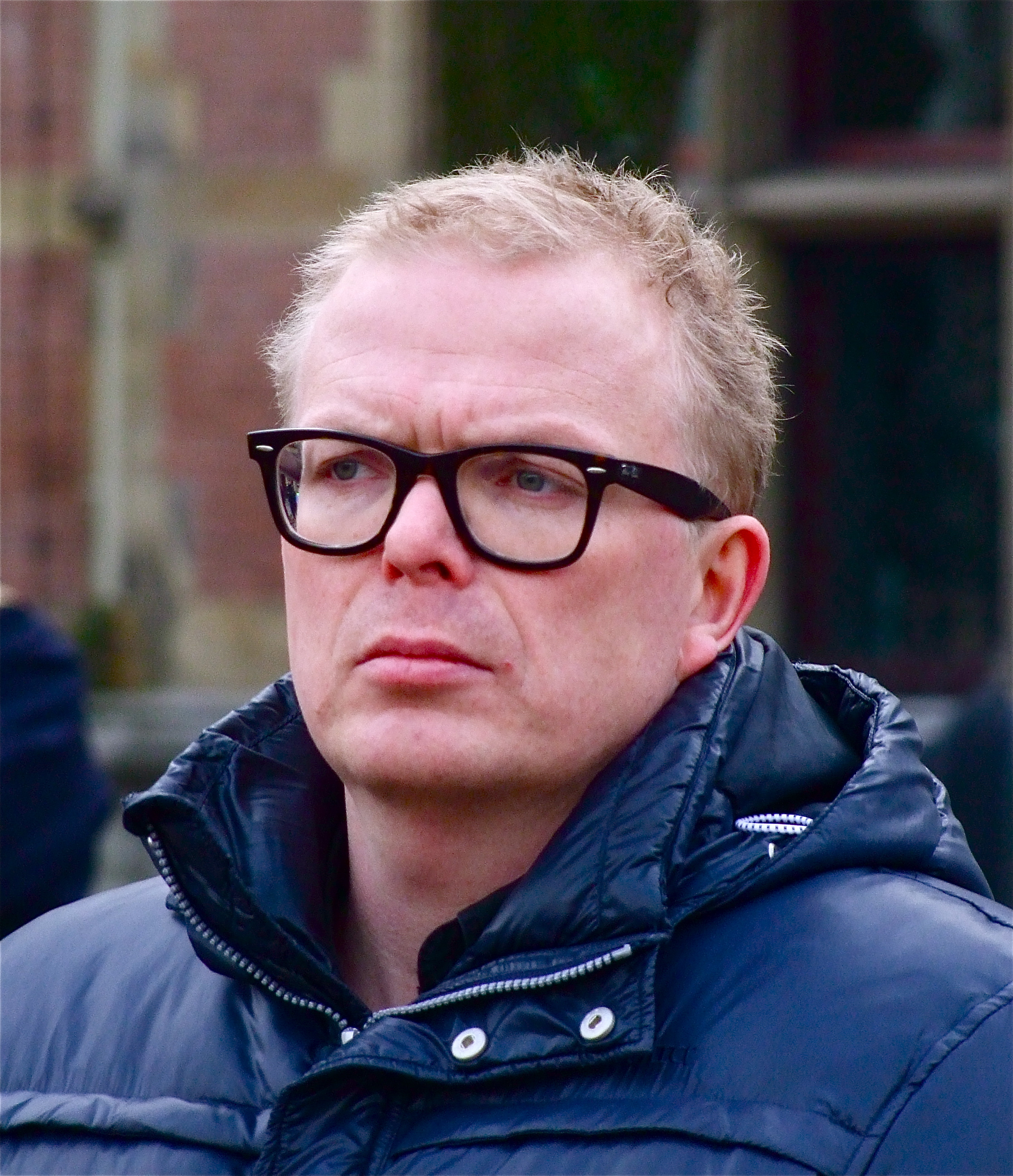
- Roos in 2011
- Born: 27 January 1977 (age 49); Alkmaar, Netherlands
- Occupations: Journalist; broadcaster; presenter; politician

Jan Roos (Dutch pronunciation: [jɑn ˈroːs]; born 27 January 1977 in Alkmaar) is a Dutch journalist and former political candidate and activist.

== Career ==
Roos worked for the PowNed public broadcasting association, where he made reports for the daily PowNews news program. He also made the radio programme Echte Jannen for PowNed.

Roos used to be a reporter for BNR Nieuwsradio. He later worked for the Dutch self described "politically incorrect" blog GeenStijl.

In 2015 Jan Roos was the campaign leader for GeenPeil, a campaign which got a referendum on the EU-Association Treaty with Ukraine on the books. During this campaign Jan Roos often wore a sailor cap.

GeenPeil later ran as a political party in the 2017 general election. It failed to gain enough votes to win any seats in the Dutch parliament. Roos campaigned as top candidate of the VoorNederland party, also gaining no seats.

== Personal ==
Jan Roos is divorced and has three children.

Jan Roos has a criminal conviction for an attack on a 16-year-old boy in 2018 and was fined 750 euro for it. Additionally, he had to pay 700 euro to the victim. The minor suffered a traumatic brain injury, neck pain, mouth bleeding, and a loose front tooth.

Roos was arrested on 29 November 2024 for inciting to threaten PowNed reporters on Ameland and put on trial on 5 November 2025, in which he was freed from prosecution because his comments were deemed to be satire, not actual threats.
