= Daan Nieber =

Dutch journalist (born 1980)

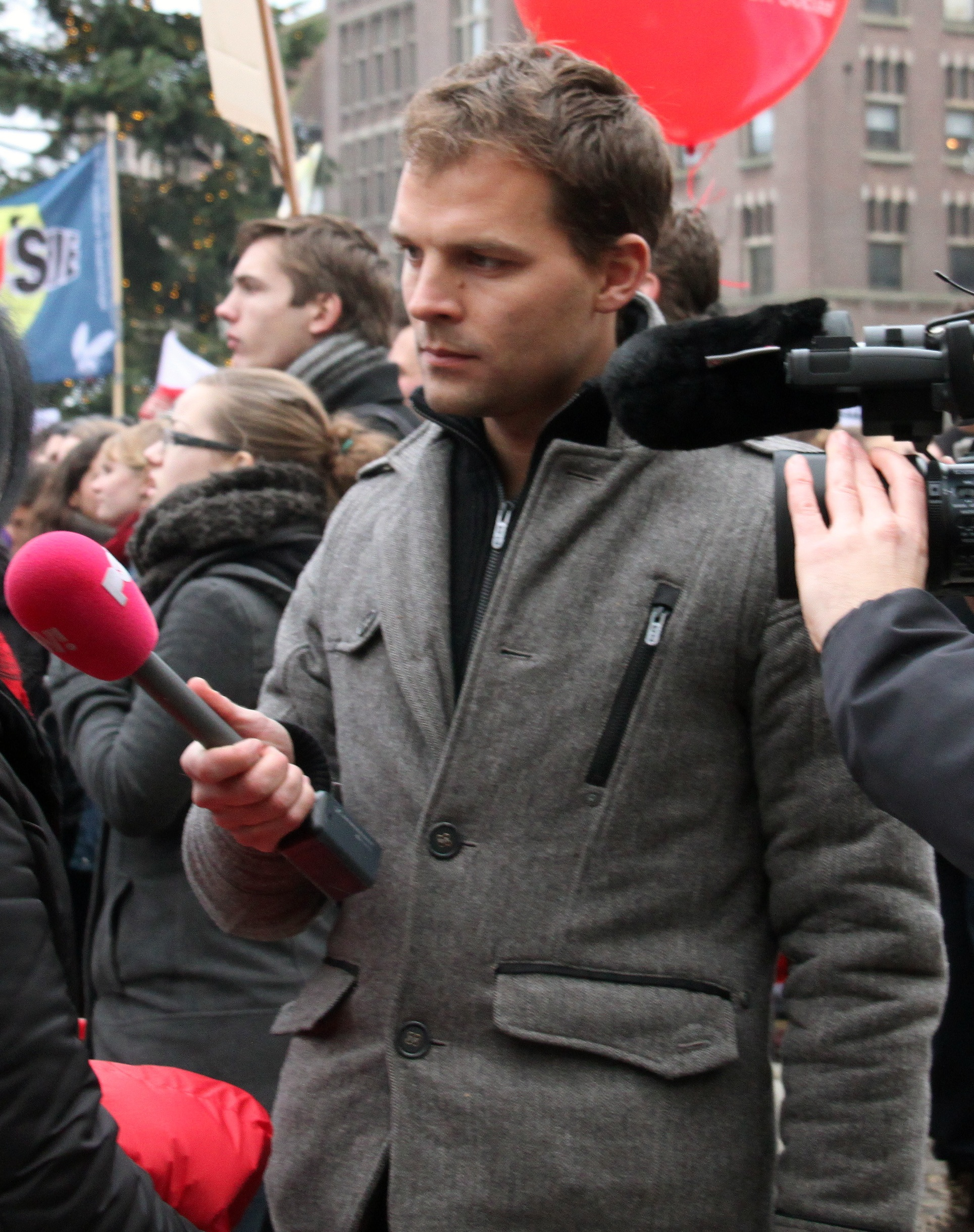
- Born: November 6, 1980 (age 45); Amsterdam, Netherlands
- Occupations: Journalist, broadcaster and presenter

Daan Nieber (born in Amsterdam on November 6, 1980) is a Dutch journalist who worked for the PowNed public broadcasting association. He reported for the daily PowNews news programme.

He was a presenter of the short-lived Dutch version of CQC on Veronica alongside Pieter Jouke and Beau van Erven Dorens.

In 2021, he appeared in the television game show De Verraders. In 2023, he appeared in the television game show Alles is Muziek. From 2021 until end of 2024, Nieber was one of the hosts of RTL Boulevard. Since March 2025, he is one of the presenters of RTL Ontbijtnieuws.
