= Drachten =

- Town
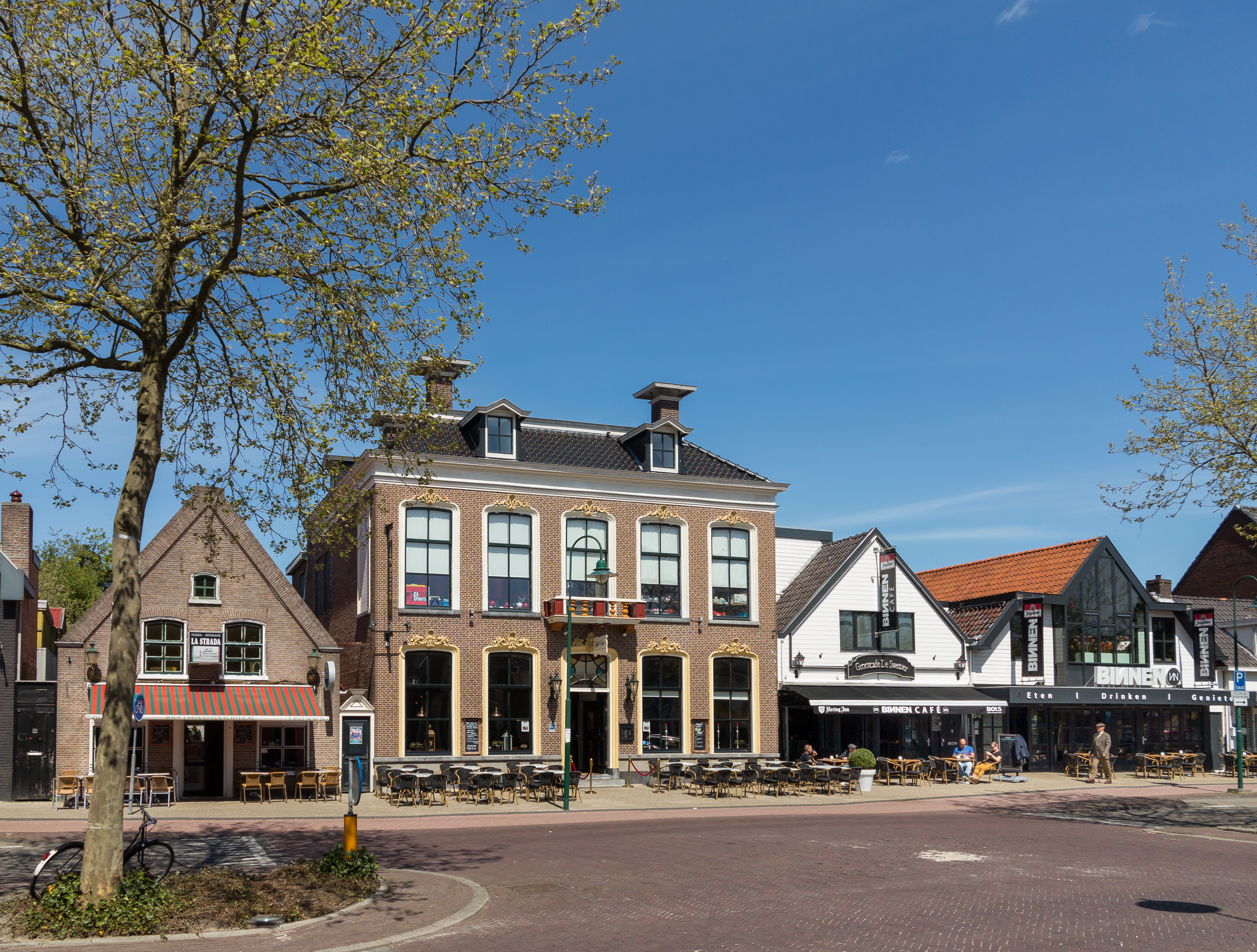

- Flag Coat of arms

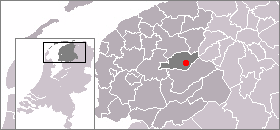
- Location in Smallingerland, Friesland, Netherlands

- Location in the Netherlands Drachten (Netherlands)
- Coordinates: 53°06′N 06°06′E
- Country: Netherlands
- Province: Friesland
- Municipality: Smallingerland

Population
  - Total: 56,098
- Time zone: UTC+1 (CET)
  - Summer (DST): UTC+2 (CEST)
- Postal code: 9200-07
- Telephone area: 0512

Drachten (Dutch pronunciation: [ˈdrɑxtə(n)], West Frisian: [ˈdraχtn̩]) is a town in the northern Netherlands. It is located in the municipality of Smallingerland, Friesland. It had a population of around 56,098 in 2023 and is the second largest town in the province of Friesland.

== History ==
=== Beginnings ===
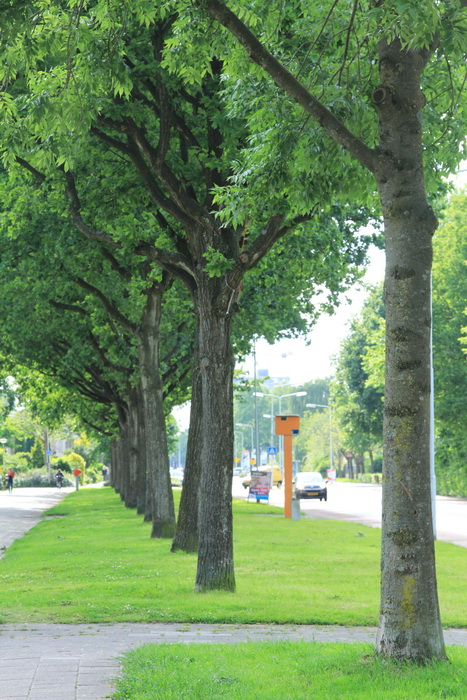
Road green

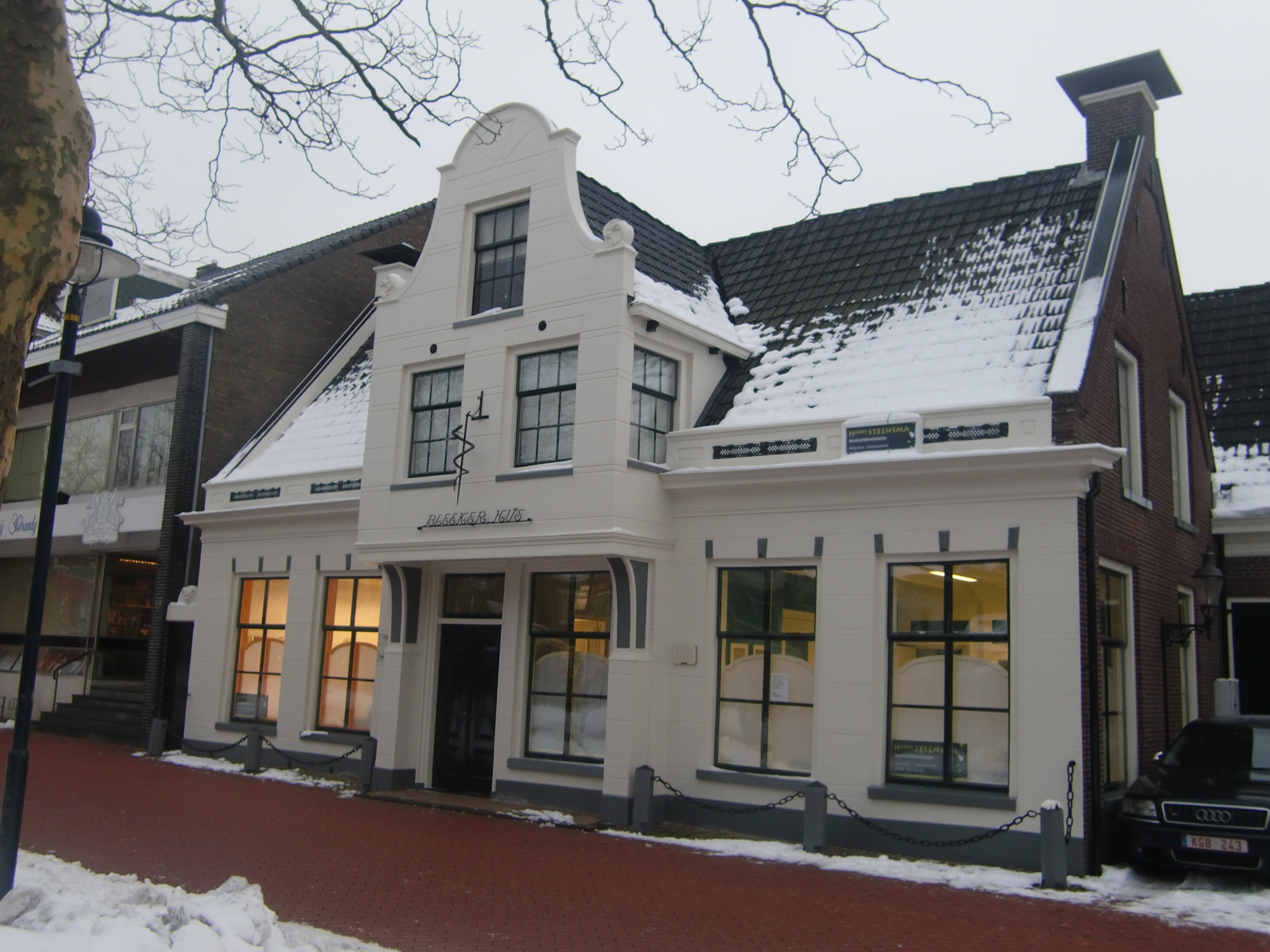
The Bleekerhûs

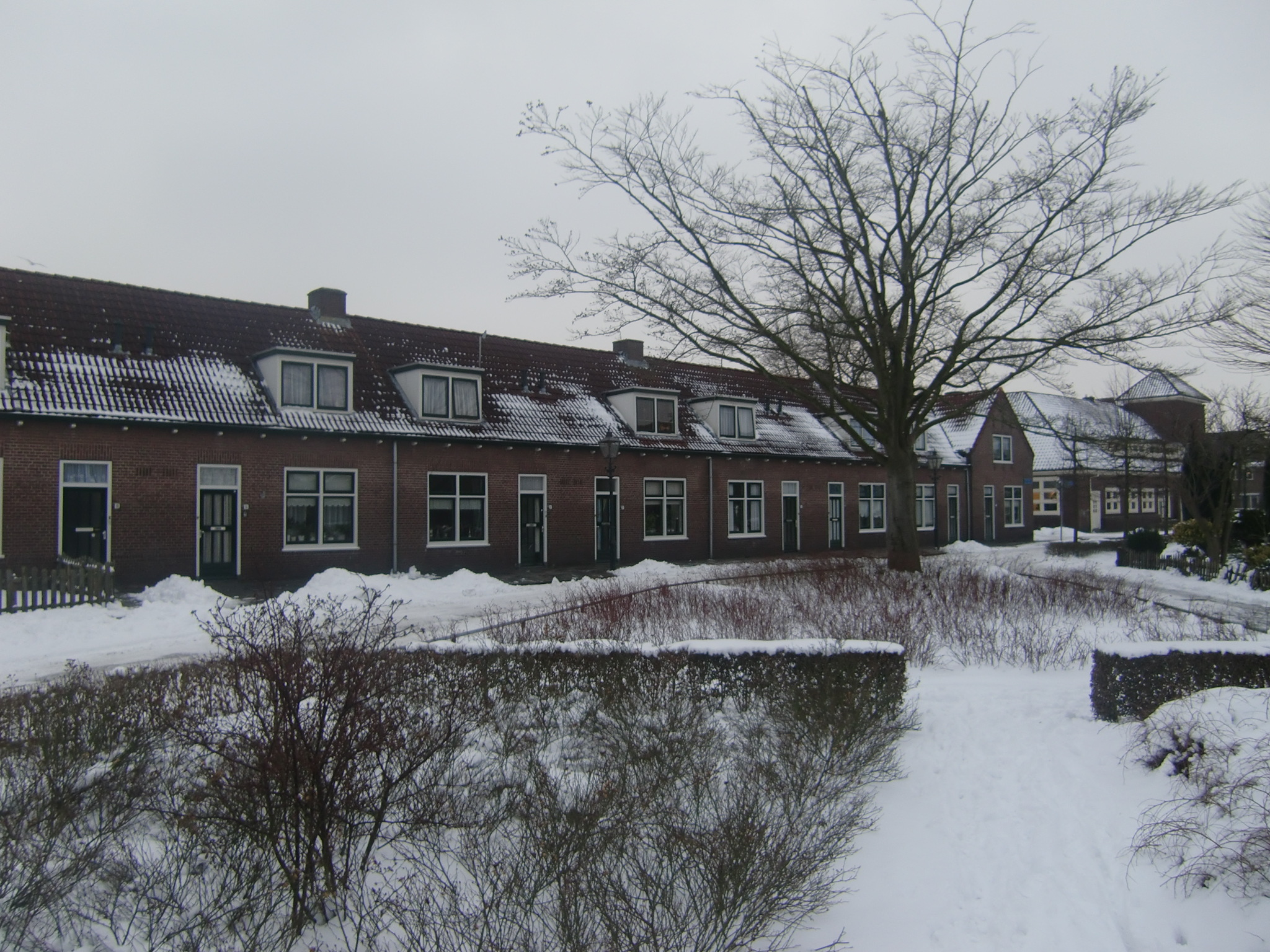
Community "Beter Wonen" (better living)

Drachten began as a small community on the east side of the Drait (or Dracht) river. There, early settlers started draining the land to use it for agriculture. As the process of draining progressed, residents began to move further eastward in order to use the drained land—former peatbogs—for agriculture.

Around 1200 A.D., a small stone church was built. It was used for 200 years afterward, until rising waters drove people even further east.

By 1550 the Dutch peat reserve had been exhausted. Peat had become an important source of energy, not only for private households but also for the industry. The need in the rapidly growing province of Holland during the 17th century was higher than Friesland could supply. Most of the transport was over water, therefore often by track boat. Peat exploitation meant a welcome activity for many villages, although most of the income did not flow into the pockets of the struggling peat cutters. In 1641, farmers in Drachten North and Drachten South entered into an agreement with wealthy residents of The Hague, the 'Drachten Associates'. One of these moneylenders was businessman Passchier Hendriks Bolleman from The Hague. The agreement stipulated that peat cut in Smallingerland was designated for the Holland industry. For transport by boat the Drachtster Compagnonsvaart canal and two side channels had to be constructed. During one year 800 workers had been digging every day. And where people spent their days, other developments followed, such as dwellings, places for storage, hostels and businesses. Although the economic success of cutting peat was short-lived (it even led to Passchier Bolleman's financial ruin), it spurred on to the foundation of Drachten.

The Drachtstervaart brought in ships and the ships brought in not only return freight, but also their own service industry: rope-yards, carpenter's yards and forges. In 1746 the first real shipyard was established on the Langewijk, initially only for the construction of timber flatboats, but after 1895 also for iron hull ships. In 1902 a second shipyard followed on the Drachtstervaart.

=== Drachten grows ===
Along the side of the canal, pubs, shops, shipbuilding facilities, and public utilities, such as a rope-walk, were built. Around 1830, a town hall was built, and a notary public moved from nearby Oudega to Drachten.

The peat industry of Drachten lasted for 200 years. When it ended, the poorer workers stayed behind; some became small farmers, but most of them had no success.

=== Accelerated growth ===
In the post-war period between 1950 and 1991, Drachten grew by an average of 1,000 inhabitants a year. The arrival of the Philips company was a major contributor to this growth. Today there are approximately 45,000 people living in Drachten; its major industrial production includes electrical goods, transport equipment, machinery, food, chemicals and furniture.

== Geography ==
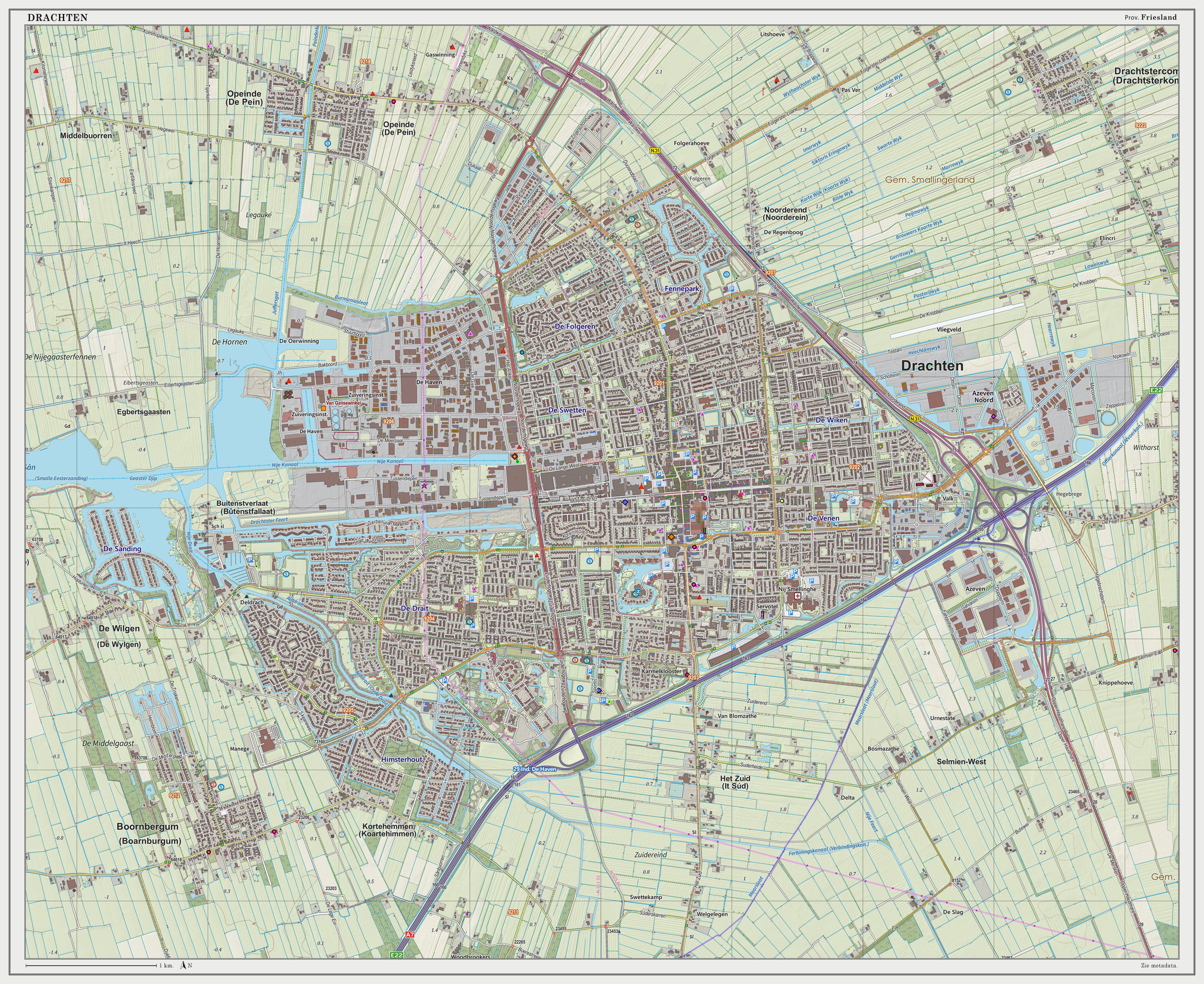
2014 map of Drachten

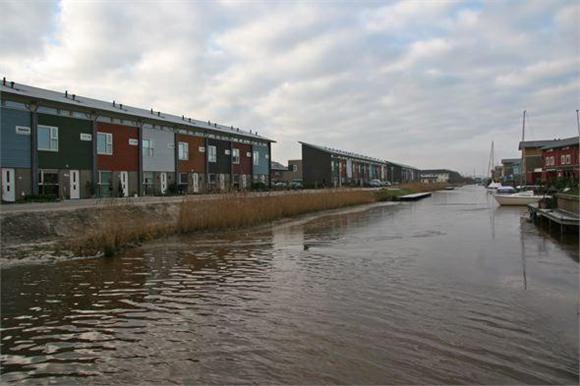
The Drachtster Feart (Drachtstervaart)

Drachten is situated in the municipality of Smallingerland in the east of the province of Friesland in the north of the Netherlands. Leeuwarden is 35 kilometres (22 mi) to the northwest, Groningen 45 kilometres (28 mi) northeast, and Heerenveen 24 kilometres (15 mi) southwest.

It is located along the Wijde Ee waterway, which flows into the larger Prinses Margriet Kanaal. It is surrounded by many small towns; its environment consists of lowlands with forests and peat moors, and nearby lakes.

== Culture ==
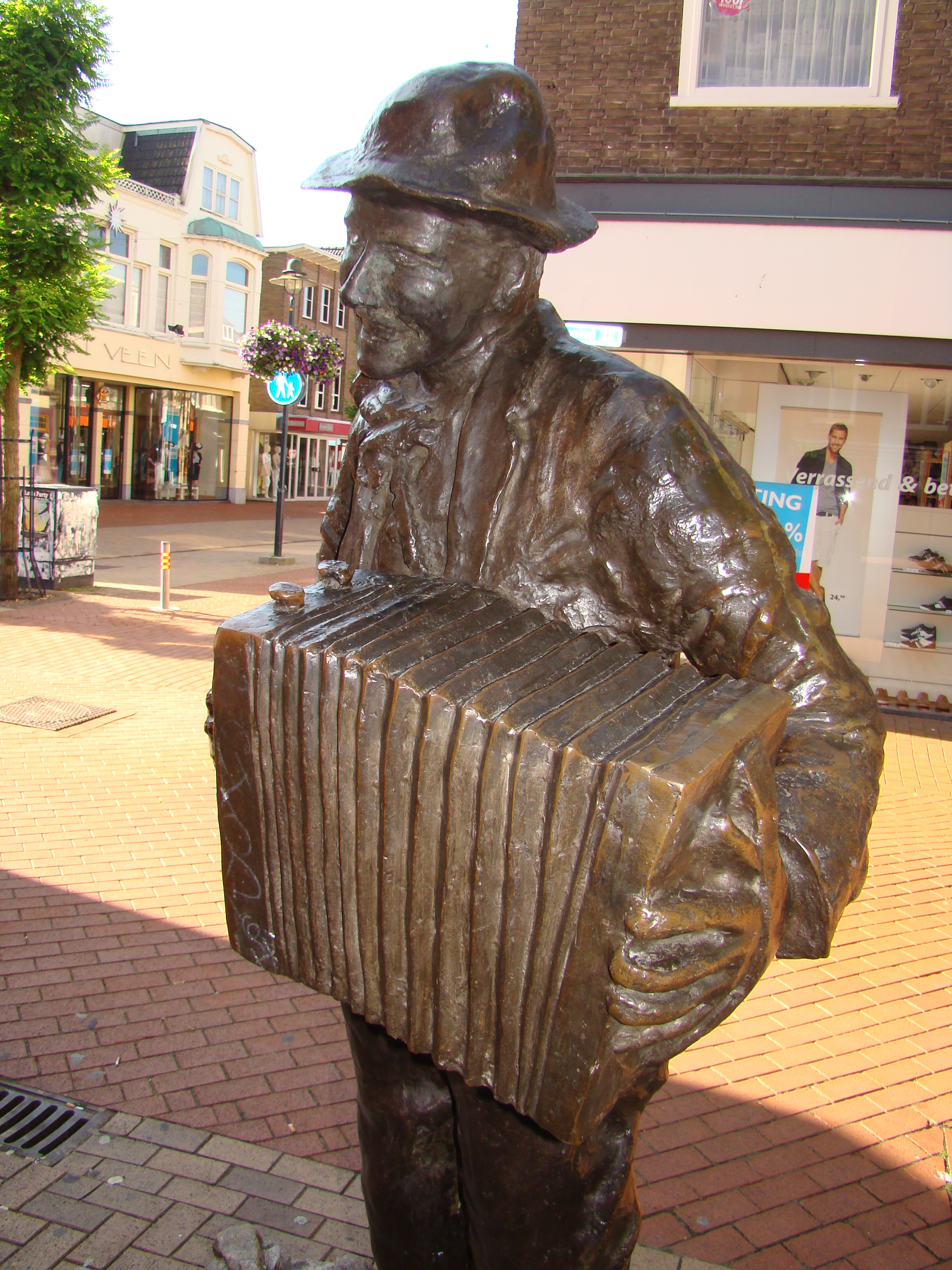
Statue of former street-musician Peije

=== Art project "Water is Life" ===
In April 2007, artist Henk Hofstra painted a road in Drachten blue with white lettering and traffic markings. The road is called Moleneind. The lettering spells "Water is Leven" (Water is Life), meant to symbolize a prior waterway that was paved over.

The part of this water that was situated in the centre of Drachten was closed in the 1960s, in order to stimulate the local economy and give space to the increased road traffic. Now the centre of the town was no longer reachable by boat.

In 1996 the first plans were made to recreate the water way into the heart of the town so water tourists will come back to Drachten and visit the centre by boat; it is called the "Drachtstervaart" project. The reconstruction of the area started in 2001 and was supposed to last until 2011. Due to the economic crisis, the construction was stopped for about two years.

The construction on the water way continued in 2013, and it has since been completed.

== Infrastructure ==
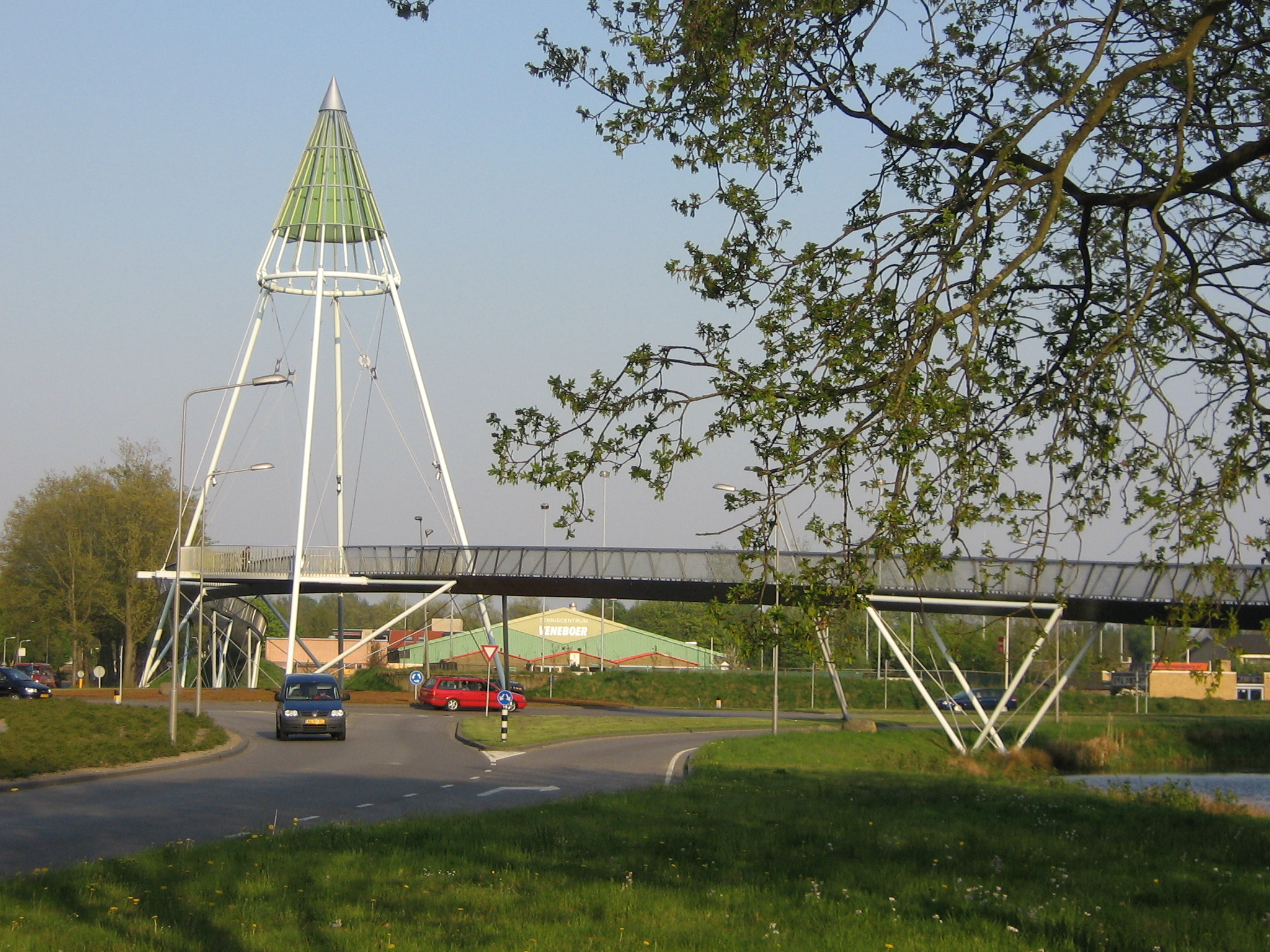
Bicycle bridge De Slinger

Drachten is not served by the Dutch railway system but it is situated next to the A7 motorway. Its extensive bus system connects it to Leeuwarden, Groningen, Heerenveen, and other centres. Around the 1980s zuiderdwarsvaart 78 was used as a church.

=== Traffic experiment ===
Drachten received international attention for a traffic experiment known as shared space, a concept pioneered by Hans Monderman. Almost all traffic lights and signs have been removed in the town's centre in an effort to improve traffic safety, based on the theory that drivers pay more attention to their surroundings when they cannot rely on strict traffic rules. Previously the town's centre had an average of eight accidents per year. In the first two years after the system was introduced, yearly accidents were reduced to one.

== Notable people ==
- Douwe Amels (born 1991) track and field athlete
- Herman Theodoor Colenbrander (1871–1945) historian
- Lex van Dam (born 1968) investor, tv personality
- Tim Douwsma (born 1987) singer
- Couhaib Driouech (born 2002) football player
- Gerrit Hiemstra (born 1961) meteorologist and weather presenter
- Henk de Jong (born 1964) football manager
- Harrie Langman (1931–2016) politician of the People's Party for Freedom and Democracy (VVD)
- Bas Paternotte (born 1976) journalist and blogger
- Fedde Schurer (1898–1968) journalist, poet, and politician
- Jack de Vries (born 1968) political consultant and lobbyist
- Sytze Wierda (1839–1911) architect and engineer
