= Jojanneke van den Berge =

Dutch journalist (born 1980)

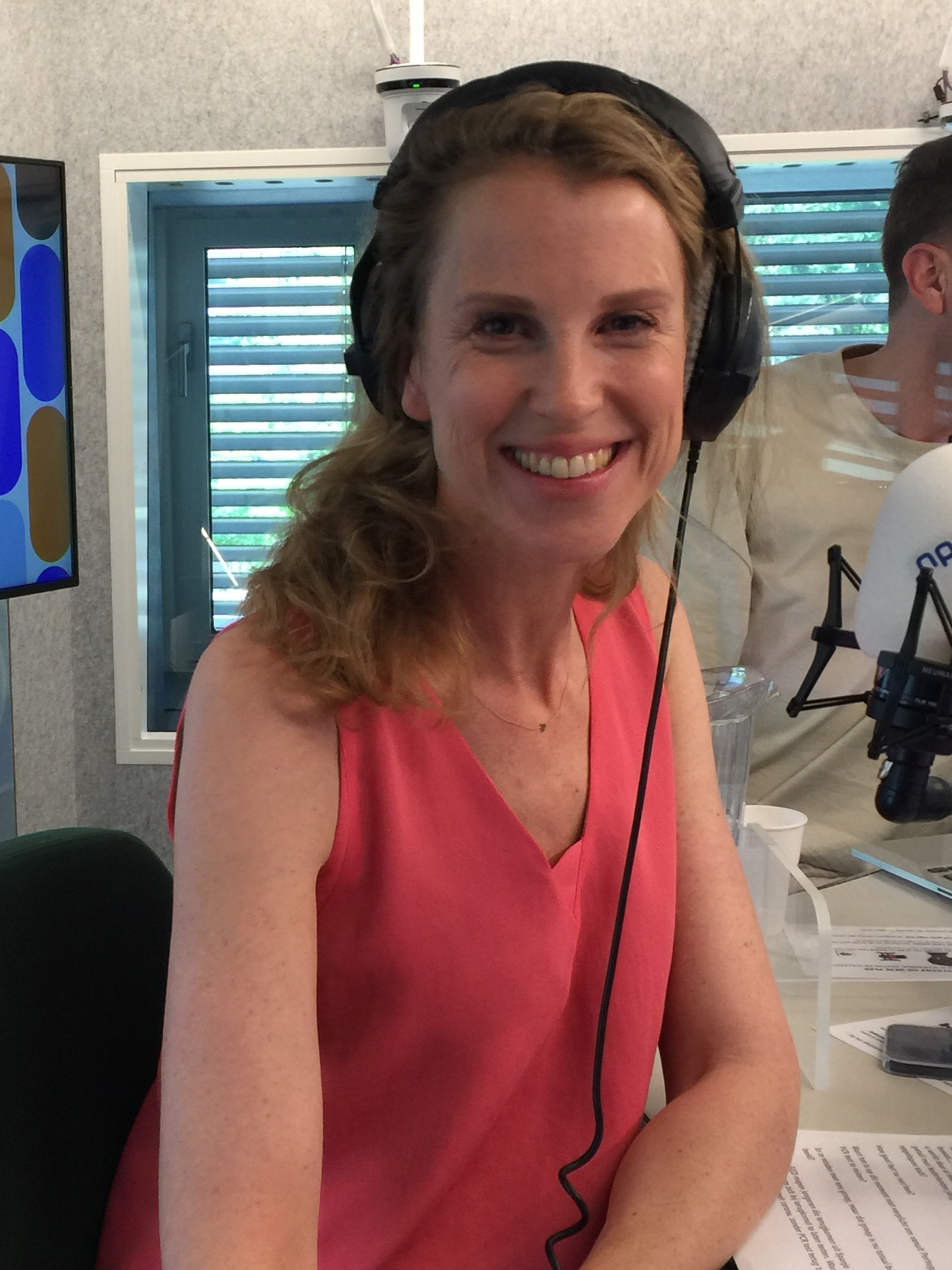
- Van den Berge (2021)
- Born: 30 May 1980 (age 45); Eindhoven, Netherlands
- Other name: Powjanneke
- Occupations: Journalist, broadcaster and presenter

Jojanneke van den Berge (Eindhoven, 30 May 1980) is a Dutch journalist who worked for the broadcasting association PowNed.

== Background ==
Van den Berge studied Communication Science and International Development Studies at the University of Amsterdam.

== Career ==
For three years she wrote stories for the opinion magazine HP/De Tijd and until September 2010 also for the free newspaper De Pers. For that paper she wrote together with Mark Koster as Koster and Jojanneke.

From September 2010 until July 2012 she worked as a reporter for the PowNed television programme PowNews.
