= Bas Paternotte =

Dutch journalist (born 1976)

- Born: 1 September 1976; Netherlands
- Occupation(s): Journalist, broadcaster and presenter

Bastiaan Paschier (Bas) Paternotte (born 1 September 1976 in Drachten) is a Dutch political reporter for the blogs ThePostOnline.nl (formerly DeJaap.nl) and GeenStijl and formerly for the magazine HP/De Tijd. and a political commentator on the PowNed radio programme Echte Jannen (segment: Haagse Geluid met Bas Paternotte) on Radio 1.

He used to be a political journalist for the Dutch Metro newspaper.
