= Retecool =

Online magazine

- Website: retecool.com

Retecool (English: Asscool) is a weblog/webmagazine that has existed since May 23, 2000. The initiator of this project is Hubert Roth (aka Reet). According to a survey by marketing blog MarketingFacts.nl, Retecool is currently the fourth largest weblog in the Netherlands. According to themselves the weblog is mainly visited by public aged between 24 and 44 years old. Retecool is a shock blog, similar to Geenstijl.

== Overview ==
Retecool made a breakthrough in the media on June 19, 2001 with an article related to webcam abuse by teenagers.

Retecool made the national press often through its regular "Foto Fuck Friday" event, the modifying of photos related to a current event. An example of this relates to the new Dutch television channel Talpa. Many photo modifications with the new channel as topic were sent in. Talpa representative Maarten van Rooijen told De Telegraaf: "Sometimes it is funny, but there are references to terrorism and the Holocaust. We absolutely don't want to be associated with that." Talpa demanded that Retecool removed the photos within 24 hours of the website, which eventually happened.

Another picture showed the face of the Minister of Transport, Public Works and Water Management Camiel Eurlings morphing into that of Prime-Minister Jan Peter Balkenende. Eurlings claimed in an interview that he was shocked by the picture: "Those glasses make me look like my brother."

Following the Jyllands-Posten Muhammad cartoons controversy, the Foto Fuck Friday involved "using historic depictions of the Prophet Muhammad endorsing everyday commercial products.

As of 2007 Retecool has tens of thousands of visitors a day, and is now more than a linkblog. The section "Luister" (English: Listen) provided a couple of years new obscure available music with description. Urban Desing [sic] displays photos and pictures of graphic design from the street.

In December 2006, Retecool won the award for Best Weblog of Europe outside the United Kingdom, taking 30 percent of the votes. A year later Retecool successfully defended that award.

== Vocabulary ==
The editors and commentators on Retecool have taken up their own kind of language, taking clues from "street language," local dialects and other jargon. The Retecool Wiki has an overview to help visitors unfamiliar with the used language. Some examples:

- lutser - contamination of loser and prutser (faulty and unhandy)
- heersen - rules.
- je weet toch - derived from "know what I'm saying" and refers to bad rap talent or low language skills.
- zuigen - sucks badly, does not rule at all.
