= NU.nl =

Dutch news website

- Website type: Online daily newspaper
- Available in: Dutch
- Headquarters: Hoofddorp
- Owner: DPG Media
- Editor: Lindsay Mossink
- Website: www.nu.nl
- IPv6 support: No
- Launched: 1999; 27 years ago
- Current status: online

NU.nl (Dutch pronunciation: [ˈny pʏnt ɛnˈɛl]) is a Dutch online newspaper. NU.nl writes their own news articles and employs several reporters to gather news in the field. The website has three full-time political editors in The Hague. Lindsay Mossink is the editor-in-chief of NU.nl. NU.nl is owned by the Belgian media group DPG Media.

== History ==
=== Ilse Media ===
The site was founded in 1999 was the first Dutch news website that published news 24 hours a day. Kees Zegers, Sacha Prins, Merien ten Houten and Robert Klep were the site's founders and Joost Boermans and Charlotte van Berne were its first editors. The site was a joint venture of Ilse Media Groep and Virtual Industries Online Marketing Solutions.

=== Sanoma ===
In 2001 NU.nl changed hands to Sanoma, when Ilse Media Groep was bought by VNU. In 2002 Rogier Swagerman became editor-in-chief. Together with Wiggers (publisher), he started collecting pictures from readers. These pictures were offered to news agencies. In 2002 NU.nl made a mobile version of its site available for use. In 2006 Swagerman was replaced by Laurens Verhagen (up to then editor at Webwereld).

In 2007 the website got several subpages or extensions. NUsport for sports news and NUzakelijk for financial and business news. The site started collecting readers' commentaries. On NUjij people could comment on news stories and upload their own. On NUfoto (amateur) photographers could send in photographs of recent events.

In 2008 a map was added (NUkaart) and later more expansions followed, of which NU&toen and NUlive were the most important. NU&toen is a continually expanding historical image library where events from the past are recalled via old photographs. NUlive was made to filter news from the big number of Dutch tweets that are published daily.

In 2009 a German version of NU.nl was launched (dnews.de), based on the Dutch site. This site was cancelled in 2011, because of disappointing visitor numbers. The site published a free printed newspaper to commemorate its 10th anniversary.

In 2011 NU.nl's appearance was altered. The alterations were made to make NU.nl more readable on bigger monitors and to stay with the times. The most important NU websites (NUzakelijk, NUsport et cetera) are since then displayed on the top of the website. On 18 November 2011, editor-in-chief Laurens Verhagen suddenly left NU.nl due to an internal disagreement, and was succeeded on 11 May 2012, by Wouter Bax, who came from the Dutch newspaper Trouw. On 1 July 2013, Bax was succeeded by Gert-Jaap Hoekman, until then the deputy editor-in-chief.

From 2019 it is prohibited on NU.nl to deny climate change and to criticize the policy. Comments via NUjij in which this happens will be removed.

In 2022 the Raad voor de Journalistiek concluded that NU.nl was not critical enough towards the government during the COVID-19 pandemic.

=== DPG Media ===
On 10 December 2019, DPG Media announced the acquisition of Sanoma's Dutch activities, barring the Finnish firm's educational ventures. On 10 April 2020, regulators approved the sale and NU.nl merged into DPG Media.

== Websites ==
- NUjij
- NUwerk
