= Rutger Castricum =

Dutch journalist and presenter

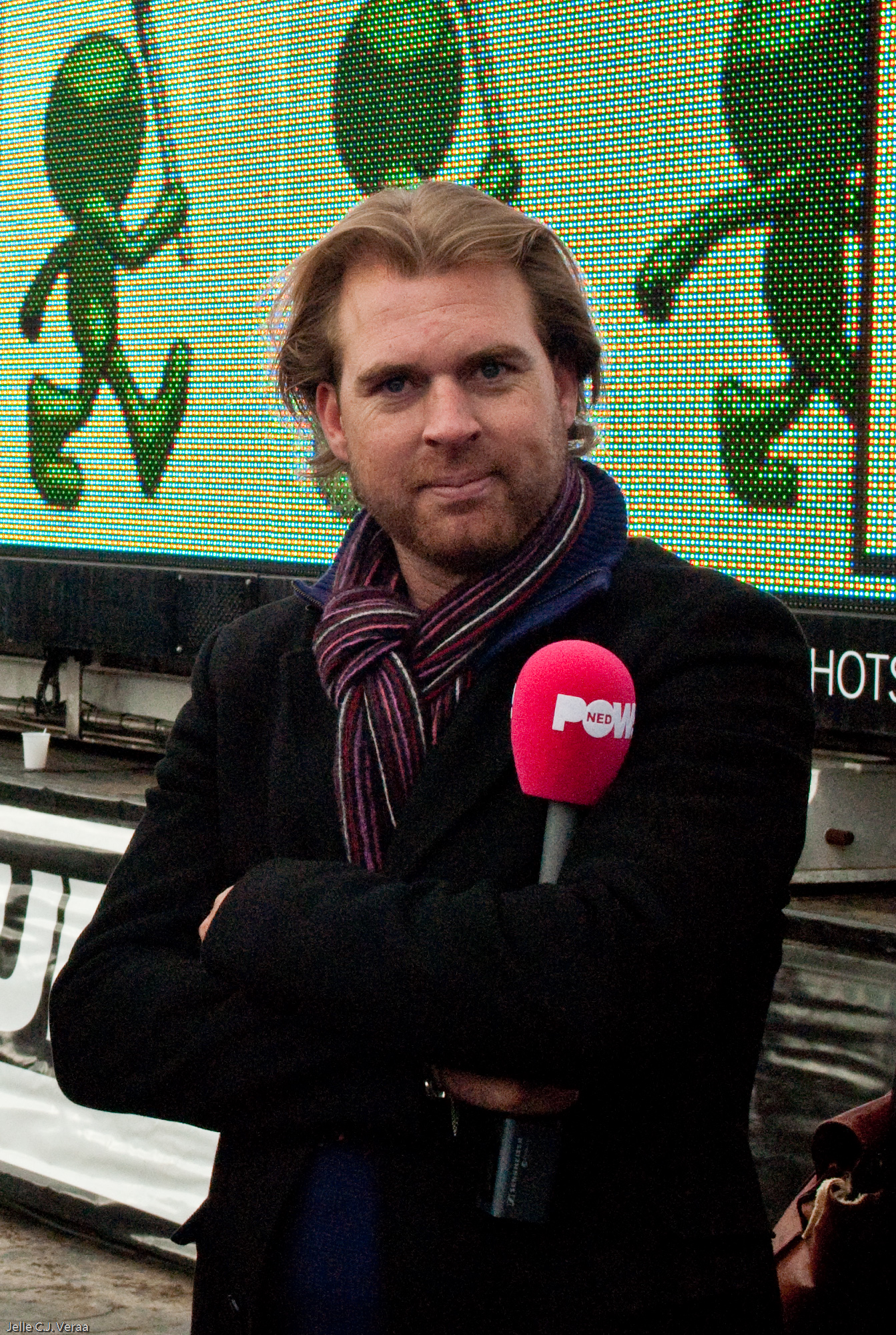
- Castricum in 2011
- Born: 29 May 1979 (age 47); The Hague, Netherlands
- Occupations: Journalist, broadcaster and presenter

Rutger Castricum (born 29 May 1979) is a Dutch journalist and presenter, who is known as reporter for the PowNews television programme by the Dutch broadcaster PowNed and previously for the blog Geenstijl.

== Career ==
On 26 April 2007, Castricum was arrested with his cameraman for filming under women's skirts to raise a point about the design of a parking garage in Heerhugowaard. The case was eventually dismissed.

He presented the 2015 television show Niet lullen maar poetsen about young people from wealthy families in Rotterdam trying to build their own company. In March 2017, Castricum and Maxim Hartman made the show Rutger & Maxim kiezen partij in the days before the 2017 Dutch general election. In 2018, he presented the television show Weg met de buren! in which he looks at neighbor disputes. In the same year, he presented the documentary Marokko op 1 about Morocco competing in the 2018 FIFA World Cup and Moroccans in the Netherlands. He also created the documentaries Druk!, Feyenoord op 1 and Emmen op 1.

He presented the quiz show De Bluffer in 2021. In 2023, Castricum was nominated for the Sonja Barend Award, awarded annually for best television interview. He was nominated for an episode of his 2023 television show Rutger en de Nationalisten in which he looks at nationalism.

Castricum also presented the political television shows De Hofbar and De Hofkar. In 2025, he presented the show Hofstad & Land in which he talks to citizens and politicians about issues in society. In the same year, he presented the show Rutger en de Uitkeringstrekkers about people with welfare benefits. He also presented the 2026 show Nog Eén Keer Fit in which former footballers Wesley Sneijder, Wim Kieft and Royston Drenthe train to regain their fitness.

== Selected filmography ==
=== As presenter ===
- Niet lullen maar poetsen (2015)
- Rutger & Maxim kiezen partij (2017)
- Feyenoord op 1 (2017)
- De Hofbar
- Weg met de buren! (2018)
- Druk! (2018)
- Emmen op 1 (2018)
- Marokko op 1 (2018)
- De Hofkar
- De Bluffer (2021)
- Rutger en de Nationalisten (2023)
- Hofstad & Land (2025)
- Rutger en de Uitkeringstrekkers (2025)
- Nog Eén Keer Fit (2026)
- Rutgers Lobby (2026)
- Rutger en de Buitenlanders (2026)

=== As contestant ===
- Het Jachtseizoen (2024)
