= Webwereld =

Dutch IT news website (1995–2020)

- Available in: Dutch
- Founded: 1995
- Dissolved: 2020
- Founder: Oscar Kneppers
- Services: IT news
- Parent: International Data Group
- Website: webwereld.nl at the Wayback Machine (archived 2017-03-01)
- Commercial: Yes
- Current status: Defunct

Webwereld was a Dutch online newspaper about IT by the International Data Group. It was the oldest Dutch technology website until it was discontinued in 2020.

== History ==
Webwereld was founded in 1995 by Oscar Kneppers, who got the idea after visiting Silicon Valley in the summer of that year. Another Dutch tech website Tweakers.net was founded in 1998 after Femme Taken concluded that the moderation on Webwereld was too strict.

In August 2011, Webwereld published about court documents in the Apple Inc. v. Samsung Electronics Co. lawsuit. In October 2011, Webwereld started Lektober (portmanteau of leak and October in Dutch) where they publicized about a security bug every day of the month in a website of a well-known Dutch organization. In 2011, Trans Link Systems considered suing Webwereld because they sold RFID writers that could be used for free traveling in Dutch public transport.

== Journalists ==
- Brenno de Winter
