= PowNews =

Dutch television news show

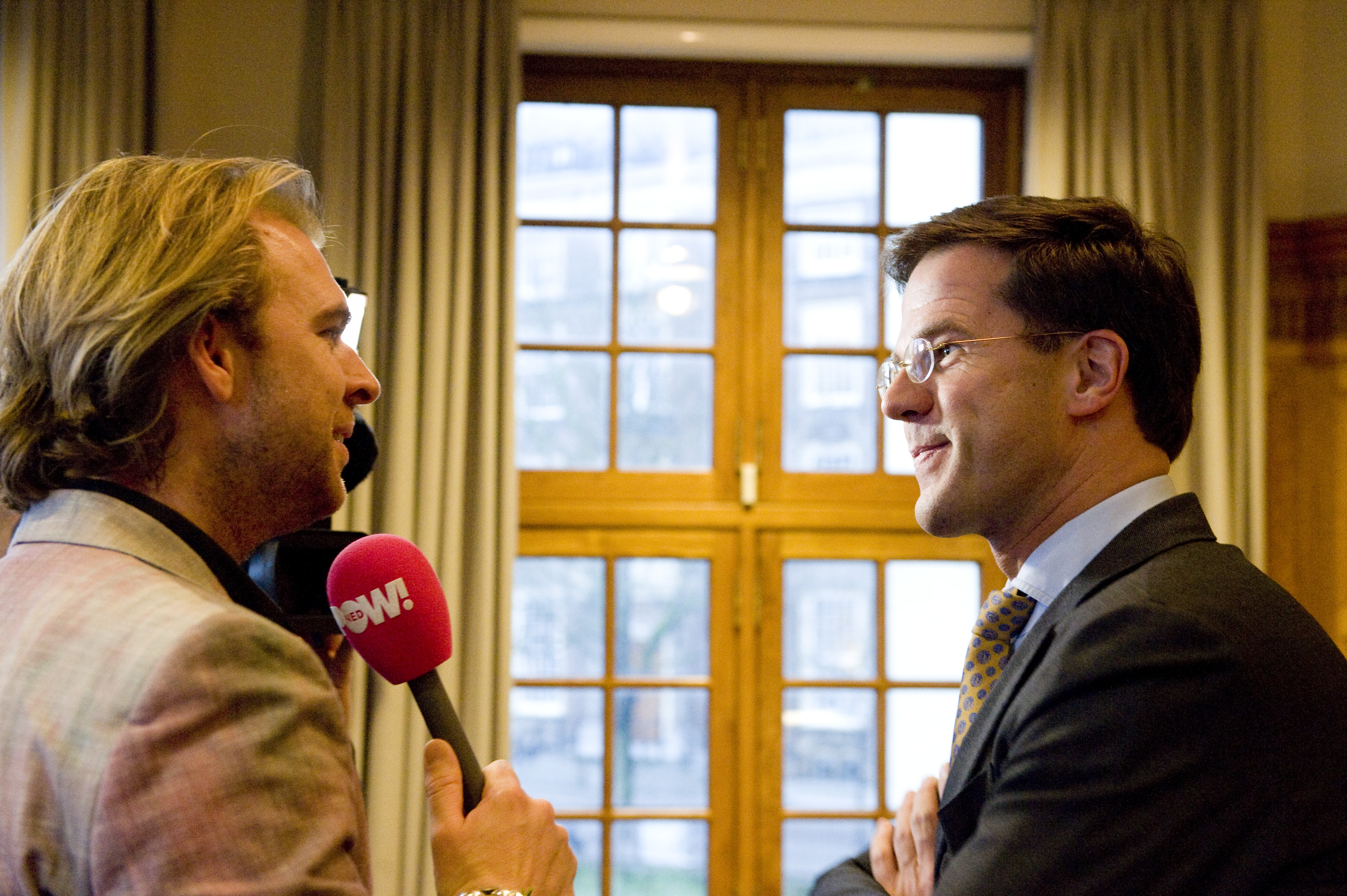
Rutger Castricum interviews prime minister Mark Rutte for PowNews

PowNews is a Dutch television news show which was broadcast on Nederland 3 from Amsterdam on Monday to Friday evenings by public broadcaster PowNed. The first broadcast was on 6 September 2010. The show ceased to exist in its current form on 5 December 2014 and was replaced by a 45-minute-long weekly show, primetime on Thursday evening.

PowNews was presented by Dominique Weesie. Some of the reporters associated with the show were Rutger Castricum, Jan Roos, Jojanneke van den Berge, Daan Nieber and Danny Ghosen.

The show was a mixture of news and entertainment, with an often provocative character and bordering on satire.
