= GeenStijl =

Dutch blog

- Website type: Blog
- Available in: Dutch
- Founder: Dominique Weesie
- Website: www.geenstijl.nl
- Commercial: Yes
- Registration: Optional
- Launched: 10 April 2003

GeenStijl is a Dutch blog founded on 10 April 2003. The logo is a pink coloured crown within a circle. In the Dutch language, the term "geen stijl" (literal translation: no style) is used to describe an act by a person or organisation that lacks style or manners.

GeenStijl often uses a provocative tone when referring to other Internet sites and blogs. Commenters on the site are called reaguurders which is a portmanteau of the Dutch verb reageren (meaning reacting/commenting) and the adjective guur (meaning cold/unfriendly). Famously, in March 2005 GeenStijl launched a plan to unseat the second Balkenende cabinet. GeenStijl announced on their website that they would bus people from all over the country to Rotterdam, where one of the cabinet parties was holding a convention. These people could sign up as new party members at the convention, and vote against the party's participation in the cabinet. This hoax created a media uproar; even the NOS Journaal of the public television reported the event.

At the height of their existence, the blog attracted around 75,000 visitors each day and was one of the top 10 news sites of the Netherlands. This popularity has receded somewhat currently, with Geenstijl being ranked as the 60th most visited website in the Netherlands, with an approximate global position of 12.000. In comparison, the website of the Dutch state-sponsored news network NOS ranks at about global position 5000 and is the 29th most visited website in the Netherlands, both as of 2 September 2020. The most visited Dutch news website is Nu.nl as of same date according to Alexa.com, at position 25.

On 17 March 2006 the Telegraaf Media Group took a 40% interest in GeenStijl. The editorial team of Dominique Weesie and Ambroos Wiegers both owned 50% of the shares, against 30% after the takeover. The deal was claimed to be worth €2.6 million.

Not long after this deal, Telegraaf sold their interest after having changed their mind, retaining ownership of the site Dumpert. Other websites owned by GeenStijl were closed due to lack of visitors.

Dominique Weesie said that he saw a market for a tough-talking, politically incorrect blog, when he started GeenStijl in 2003, because existing blogs used language that was too vulgar for the mainstream media. One feature of the blog is the use of intentionally misspelt four-letter words to reduce their shock effect. The site has been criticized for the xenophobic and extreme nature of the comments it allows readers to post. Both the editors and the readers of GeenStijl have invented a wide range of names to refer to immigrants to the Netherlands that are generally considered to be stereotypic and derisive. They also use insulting words for right-wing people they believe to go over the mark though and in recent years inappropriate reader comments are jorissed away (as they call censoring of posts by their mods – the best-known of these used the nickname "Joris van Loghausen").

Previous logo of GeenStijl

In combination with Weesie's network, who had been a reporter for the major Dutch newspaper de Telegraaf for more than 10 years, this has proven a successful formula. Geenstijl soon followed up with web videos featuring Rutger Castricum as star reporter.

In May 2006, internet service providers in Bonaire began boycotting GeenStijl after the blog had published secret and private documents of Bonairean public prosecutor Ernst Wesselius. GeenStijl claims it obtained the documents via the P2P software LimeWire, although investigators did not find this software on Wesselius's computer (but since LimeWire runs on the more general Gnutella P2P network, he may have had any other software application that connects to Gnutella as well). The ISPs stated that "this is a one time action, because the publication has infringed our sense of ethics". Access to the site from Bonaire has since been restored.

GeenStijl started working on the television program SteenGeyl with public broadcaster BNN, in 2007. GeenStijl founder Weesie stated they were to spend "taxpayer's money." However, a dispute arose over the timeslot in which the program was to be broadcast, and production was halted. Two years later they started a successful campaign to get their own public broadcasting organisation under the name PowNed, which began broadcasting on Dutch public television in September 2010.

In May 2017 more than 100 female journalists, female politicians, actresses and other women called for an advertisement boycott of GeenStijl. The stated reason was because of the sex fantasies, some violent, that appeared on numerous occasions in the comments section.

== GeenPeil ==
In 2015 GeenStijl launched GeenPeil, a group which successfully campaigned to organise a referendum on the EU-Association Treaty with Ukraine.

== See also ==
- Retecool, another Dutch weblog
- Dumpert, video upload service, no longer belonging to Geenstijl
- PowNed, public broadcaster founded by GeenStijl in 2009
