= Barn fire =

Fire at barn or stable with farm animals

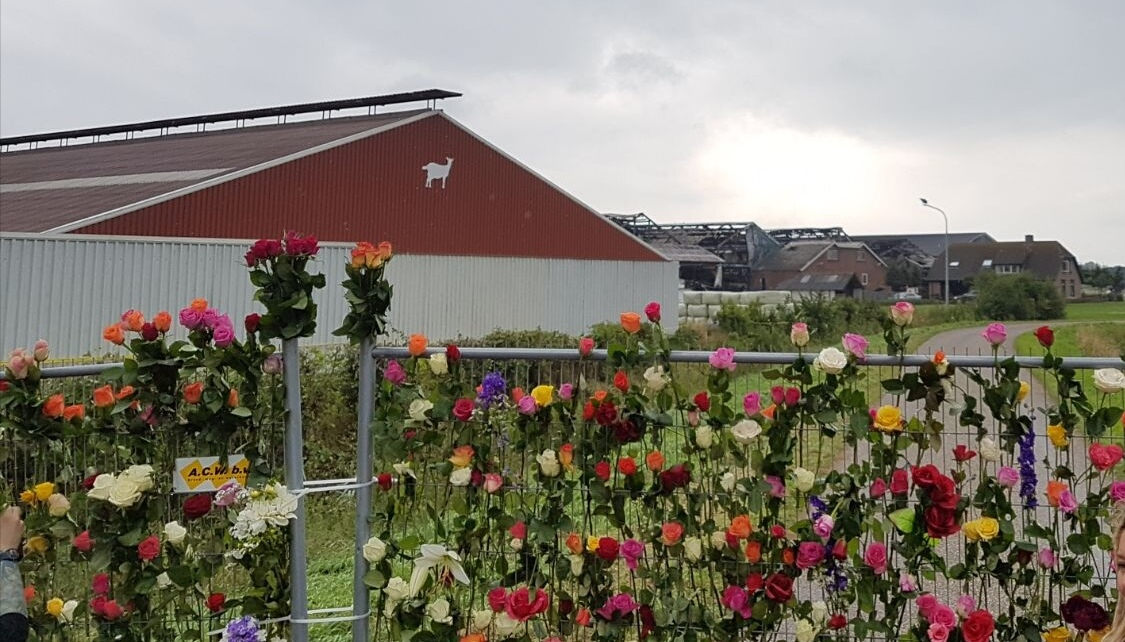
Vigil near De Knorhof in Erichem, destroyed by a barn fire in July 2017.

Wakker Dier spokesperson Hanneke van Ormondt discusses barn fires with Omroep Brabant.

A barn fire, also known as a farm fire or stable fire (especially when horses are affected), occurs when a barn or stable at a farm for the keeping of livestock catches fire, and is partially or wholly destroyed. This can lead to the death of animals, release of toxic fumes, and financial and material damage for insurers, owners, employees and nearby residents.

== Belgium ==
=== Overview of problems ===
According to Prevent Agri, there are still too few precautions taken against barn fires in Belgium. Often there are no fire extinguishing devices present, and other safety measures are often foregone because of the financial cost to the livestock company, and one usually does not take potential accidents into account in administration. Nor are there a reliable statistics on accidents, because CEOs are not obligated to register them; only employees do.

On 10 May 2011, Flemish MP Hermes Sanctorum (then a member of Groen!) asked Flemish Prime Minister and Minister of Agriculture Kris Peeters how many barn fires had occurred in the previous years and how many animals had died as a result, and whether, and if so how, the Minister was planning to take measures against it. In June, Peeters responded that there had been 143 barn fires in all of Belgium between 1 May 2006 and 1 May 2011; in 62 of those cases, animals perished. The death toll was 192,862 animals, including 27,851 pigs, 196 cattle, 164,000 poultry (rounded estimate, mainly chickens), 8 horses, 7 goats and a few rabbits. Of all fires in Belgium, about 4% was a barn fire, which were mostly caused by electricity, overheating or short circuits in machines. The Royal decree of 19 December 1997 regulates the fire safety of buildings; on 15 August 2009, it was expanded with appendix 6 which regulates the fire safety of industrial buildings, including buildings for the purpose of commercial animal husbandry. Although appendix 6 contains stricter fire precautions than existed earlier, it only applies to newly built barns; barns built prior to 2009 are not yet required to comply with the new regulations. Peeters closed by mentioning several potential safety precautions, but said that fire safety was a federal competence (and thus the Flemish Government did not have the authority to take additional measures).

=== Major barn fires ===
Reported barn fires in which over 1,000 animals died include:

- 7 July 2014: 60,000 layer hens died in Merksplas.
- 21 January 2017: 4,000 pigs (3,000 piglets and 980 sows) died in Aartrijke.
- 31 May 2017: 26,000 chickens died in Oud-Turnhout.
- 16 December 2017: 2,000 pigs died in Grammene in the municipality of Deinze.
- In 2020 at least 70,460 animals died in eleven barn fires, among which 68,502 hens and 1850 pigs.

== Canada ==
=== Overview of problems ===
The Canadian Coalition for Farm Animals evaluates that 610,000 farm animals died in fires between January 2015 and October 2018, including 5,000 cattle, 13,000 turkeys, 82,000 pigs and 450,000 chickens. National statistics about the cause of fires are not being kept, but the province of Ontario reports that 40 per cent of barn fires for which the cause can be determined are due to the deterioration of electrical systems, which can be severe in an environment with dust, humidity and corrosive gasses. The building codes of several provinces do not currently require barns to have heat detectors and alarm systems. The provinces base their own codes on the National Research Council's National Farm Building Code. A new version of the Code is planned for 2020, but may not include additional safety systems, as barns are considered "low occupancy" buildings. In any case, only new constructions are required to apply new standards. In addition, fire prevention standards are included in the voluntary codes of practice published by the National Farm Animal Care Council, which are frequently put into practice by producers.

Animal deaths usually attract little attention from the media beyond local outlets, unless they involve pets or horses.

=== Major barn fires ===
Reported barn fires in which over 1,000 animals died include:

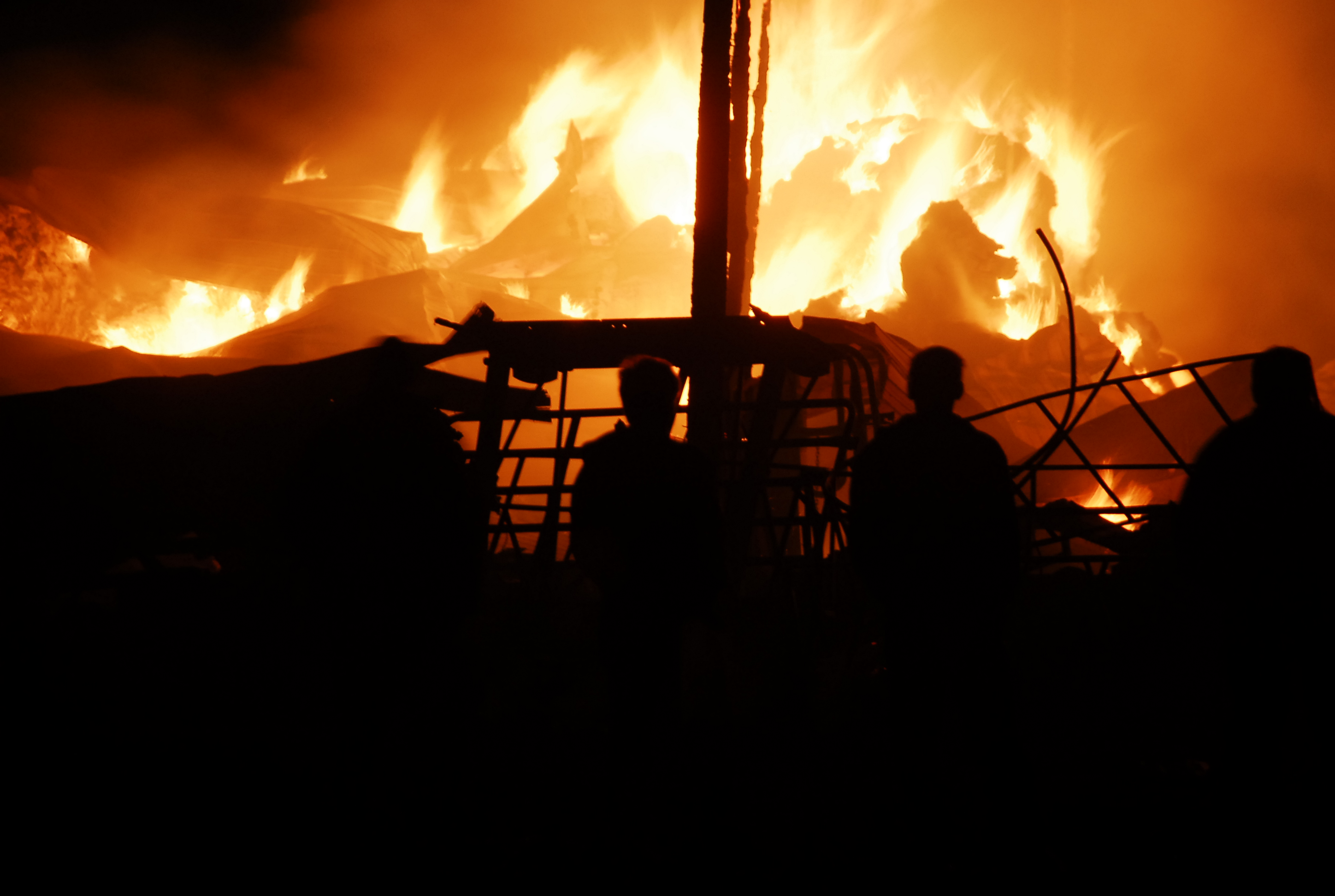
2008 barn fire in Manitoba

- 13 March 2015: 100,000 chickens died in Saint-Bernard-de-Michaudville, Quebec.
- 25 March 2015: 2,200 pigs died in Kola, Manitoba.
- 17 April 2015: 3,000 pigs died in Ste. Anne, Manitoba.
- 6 September 2015: 22,000 chicken died in Zorra Township, Ontario.
- 27 December 2015: 3,000 pigs died in Plessisville, Quebec.
- 2 January 2016: 50,000 ducks died in Racine, Quebec.
- 8 February 2016: 6,500 chickens died in Sainte-Famille, Quebec.
- 17 March 2016: 4,000 ducks died in Saint-Camille, Quebec.
- 27 September 2016: 45,000 chickens died in Busby, Alberta.
- 16 November 2016: 27,000 hens died in Terrebonne, Quebec.
- 17 January 2017: 17,000 chicken chicks died in Shefford, Quebec.
- 1 February 2017: 4,000 pigs died in Plympton–Wyoming, Ontario.
- 10 August 2017: 4,000 pigs died in Watford, Ontario.
- 4 December 2017: 4,000 hens died in Elgin, Quebec.
- 11 April 2018: 14,000 chicken chicks died in Port Coquitlam, British Columbia.
- 27 May 2018: 3,000 pigs died near Otterville, Ontario.
- 5 June 2018: 12,000 pigs died in Rosetown, Saskatchewan.
- 29 June 2018: 60,000 hens died in Rivière-Héva, Quebec.
- 15 October 2018: 30,000 chickens died in Sheffield Mills, Nova Scotia.
- 11 December 2018: 1,300 pigs died in Quinte West, Ontario.
- 29 June 2025: 27,000 chickens killed in a fire affecting three barns near Langley, BC.

== Germany ==
=== Overview of problems ===
In Germany, fire alarm systems and fire sprinkler systems are mandatory.

=== Major barn fires ===
Reported barn fires in which over 1,000 animals died include:

- 15 March 2017: 300 sheep, 500 lambs, 80 cows and 6 horses died in Elpersbüttel after a farmer's son played with fire in the barn. Animals poisoned by smoke in the adjoining barn in all likelihood had to be culled as well.
- 8 June 2017: 8,000 turkeys died in Borken, near Dutch Aalten.

== Netherlands ==
=== Overview of problems ===
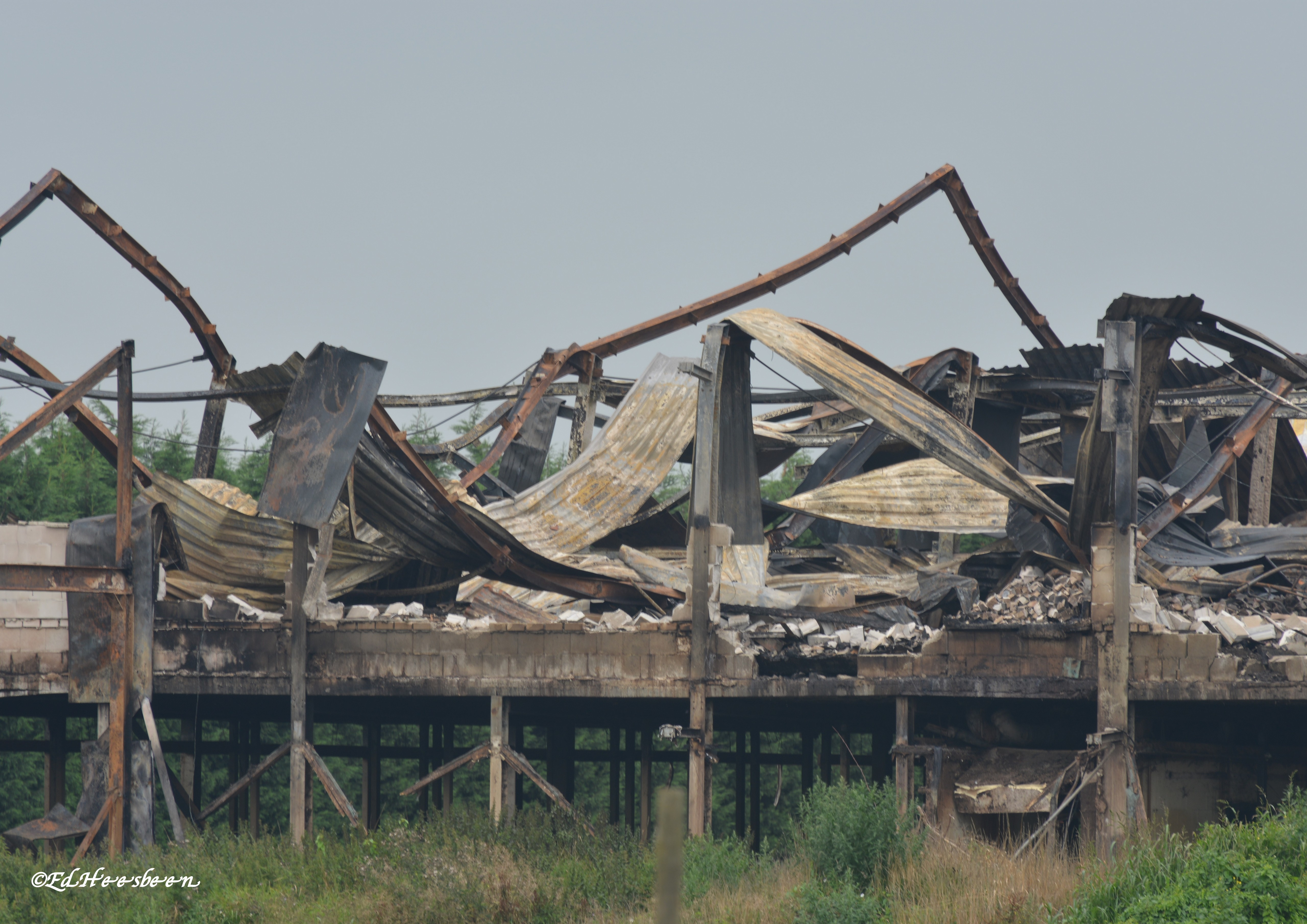
De Knorhof burnt to the ground in July 2017.

==== Causes and effects ====
Livestock barns tend to be very prone to fire because of the presence of dust, straw and manure gases, while barn roofs are often made of highly flammable pur foam, enabling fire to spread rapidly. Air washing installations, which have been mandated by the government since 2012 for many animal husbandry companies in order to reduce ammonia emissions, are flammable because of electricity. Moreover, the air ventilation system of air washers can fan the flames. The fact that animals often have no place to flee in order to escape from a fire, and the fact that chicken's feathers are highly flammable themselves, further increases the risk of fatalities. The huge increase in so-called "mega-barns" (featuring large numbers of animals packed together in a single building) from 2005 to 2013, which complicate the isolation and extinguishing of fires, also drives up the number of victims per catastrophe. All these factors combined resulted in the deaths of well over a million animals by barn fires in the Netherlands between 2006 and 2011. Finally, many animals that survive a barn fire may be so poisoned by smoke that they still need to be culled anyway.

==== Safety precautions and governmental policy ====
Because of a lack of safety precautions and government-designed regulations, many barn animals die which could have been saved. For example, emergency exits, sprinkler and alarm systems can be installed. Some livestock farmers don't do this, however, because it often costs a lot of money and is not obligatory. As of 2011, according to the Dutch building code (Bouwbesluit), animals had the same status as office supplies and machines, and did not require extra protection.

2017: Lisa Westerveld (GroenLinks Nijmegen) speaks on barn fire safety.

The Dutch government, in cooperation with farmers, insurance companies, fire brigades and the Dutch Society for the Protection of Animals, enacted the Action Plan Barn Fires 2012–2016 'to considerably reduce the amount of barn fires and animal fire victims'. The Building Code was amended in 2012 and again in 2014: henceforth, new barns had to be built using fire-resistant materials and fire compartments, and there had to be firewater present. However, the action plan appeared not to work: the number of barn fires and animal victims rose even further. Besides, the new fire safety requirements only applied to barns built after 2014; older barns (15,500 of the circa 16,550) remained just as unsafe as before, and in the 2014–2017 period by far the most fires occurred in barns constructed before 2014.

By 2017, there was still no requirement for the installation of fire alarm and sprinkler systems or emergency exits for animals. Amongst others, the Wakker Dier foundation and the Party for the Animals (PvdD) campaigned for even stricter measures and requirements in July 2017. However, a motion to that effect, tabled by Esther Ouwehand (PvdD) and Dion Graus (PVV), was voted down by a parliamentary majority of VVD, D66, CDA, CU and SGP. Farmers' lobby group LTO Nederland opposed obligatory sprinkler systems, arguing these were allegedly insufficiently tested and too expensive, particularly for smaller enterprises, and because 'most barns would never experience fires anyway'. LTO was convinced that barns had become safer since the action plan's introduction, but was puzzled why the number of barn fires and victims had only increased afterwards.

In 2018, the Action Plan Fireproof Livestock Barns 2018–2022 was launched, a sequel to the Action Plan Barn Fires 2012–2016. In the new action plan, the emphasis is on improving the fire safety in existing barns. Activist group Varkens in Nood ("Pigs in Distress") objected against the optional nature of the proposed measures, and called for extra legal demands.

Since 2009, the Dutch inventors Peter Berlang and Sjaam Hira, in collaboration with the Southeast Netherlands fire brigade and Wageningen University, developed the cable system Stable Safe. Because firefighters usually took twenty minutes to reach a burning barn, while the animals inside could be dead within ten minutes, this system was invented to let the animals escape the building automatically in the event of a fire. As soon as fire is detected, all the dividers and doors fall open and the livestock can escape outside. The system, which would cost each farm about 10,000 to 20,000 euros, was presented to the Dutch Parliament in 2015. In a test run, 65% of pigs fled outside, while the rest started to wander about. The researchers expect that, in a real fire scenario, 90% of the pigs would run for it. It would probably not work for chickens, however; when in fear, they tend to lie down flat on the ground. Just like in pigs, cattle often do not immediately flee when danger presents itself; on the other hand, horses do. After a devastating 2013 barn fire, the Spoordonk pig breeder Kees van der Meijden claims to have built 'the most fire-safe barn in all of Europe' employing numerous measures against emergencies, including a condensation apparatus that allegedly worked better than sprinklers, and trains pig farmers on how to best conduct their profession.

In 2016, a farm in Echt, belonging to the only pork production chain in the Netherlands with a triple star rating from the Dutch Society for the Protection of Animals's "Beter Leven" certification mark, experienced a barn fire, but because the pigs could escape the building, none of them died.

==== Public debate ====
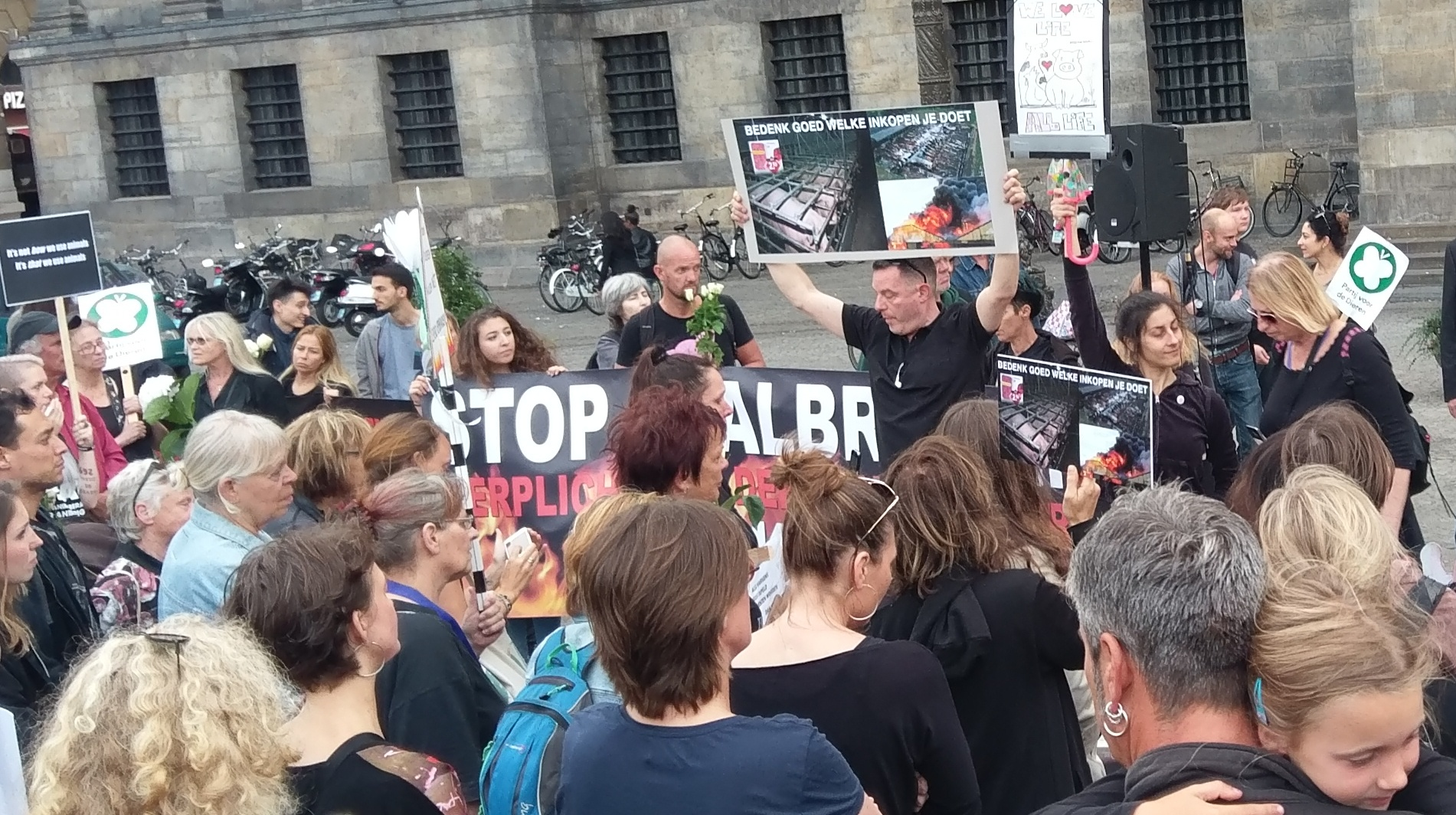
Hundreds of protesters held a vigil on Dam Square on 24 August 2017 to remember dead animals and protest cruelty against animals with texts such as "Stop barn fires. Mandate alarms and sprinklers in all barns" and "Consider your purchases carefully".

According to the Dutch Association of Insurers, there were 15 barn fires causing animal fatalities in 2015, 26 in 2016 and 28 in 2017. Because of a series of alarmingly large-scale barn fires in 2017, particularly in summer with De Knorhof in Erichem as the low point, public debate in the Netherlands broke out on fire safety in barns and animal welfare. The activist group "Burning Souls" was already founded in January 2017 by Petra Spoor, who was outraged about the fact that the media frequently reported that 'there had been no victims', but there had been hundreds or thousands of dead animals, as if animals weren't 'victims'. The group holds vigils near burnt-out barns to commemorate the perished animals with flowers, candles and minutes of silence, calls on the national and local authorities to take stricter measures, and on citizens to make their consumption pattern more animal-friendly by eating less or no meat. A similar initiative was undertaken by activist group "Eyes on Animals" after the barn fire in Oirschot, claiming the lives of 10,000 pigs in April 2016.

The Nederlandse Vereniging voor Veganisme reacted that it was "sympathetic" to hold vigils for animals burnt and asphyxiated to death, but odd that nobody was holding vigils for the circa 1.24 million animals who were slaughtered every day across the Netherlands, arguing that every dead animal should be mourned, regardless of the way in which it is killed. GeenStijl blogger Bas Paternotte also extended his compassion towards the suffering of animals in July 2017, and criticised the fact that politicians continuously failed to take better measures, although he himself continued to eat meat. Varkens in Nood launched a citizen's initiative to impose a general professional ban for Adriaan Straathof, owner of De Knorhof, which was signed over 40,000 times, meaning that Parliament had to discuss it. Straathof already had a professional ban in Germany because of cruelty to animals; Varkens in Nood sought to make that ban Europe-wide.

=== Major barn fires ===
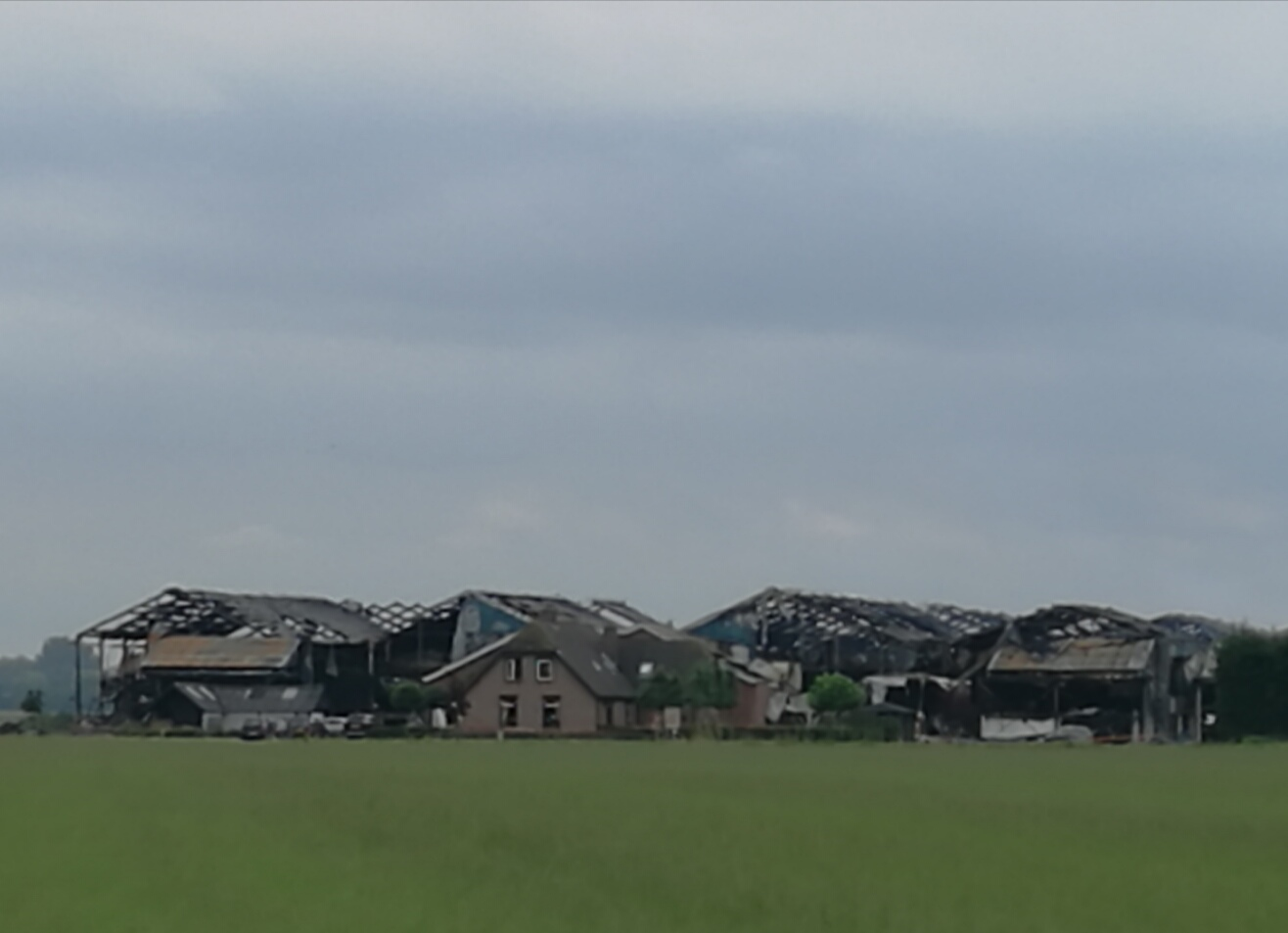
The destructive July 2017 fire at De Knorhof in Erichem killed at least 20,000 pigs.

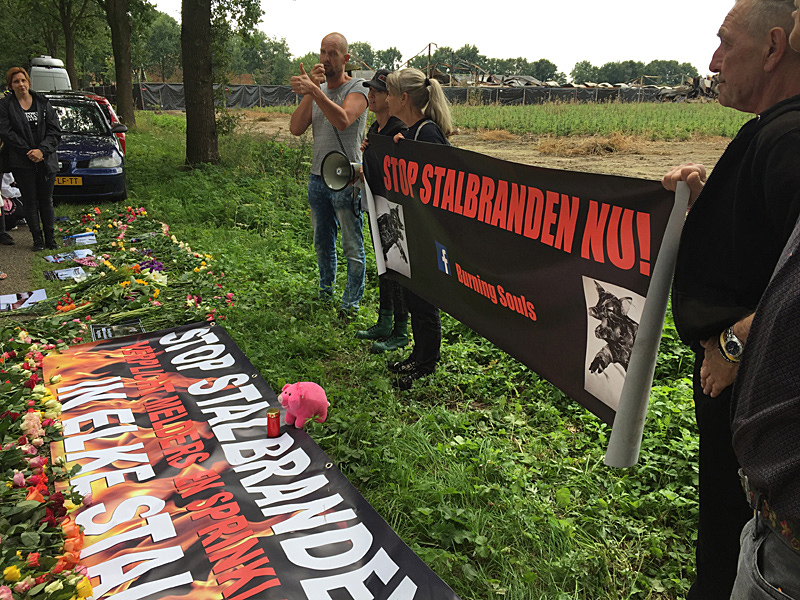
Flowers and protest against animal suffering in Groot Agelo

Reported barn fires in which over 1,000 animals died include:

- 4 May 2004: 1,600 pigs died in Wintelre.
- 2005 in total: 149 cattle, 4,054 pigs and 78,000 chickens and turkeys died in 21 fires in the entire Netherlands.
- 2006 in total: 13 cattle, 1,203 pigs and 294,934 chickens and turkeys died in 21 fires in the entire Netherlands.
- 2007 in total: 24 cattle, 5,970 pigs and 3,919 chickens and turkeys died in 22 fires in the entire Netherlands.
- 2008 in total: 760 cattle, 3,856 pigs and 236,292 chickens and turkeys died in 40 fires throughout the Netherlands.
- 2009 in total: 470 cattle, 8,641 pigs and 98,789 chickens and turkeys died in 38 fires throughout the Netherlands.
- 2010 in total: 181,000 animals died in twenty fires throughout the Netherlands.
- 2011 in total: 319,000 animals perished in the entire Netherlands, in eighteen separate fires.
  - 19 July 2011: 170,000 chickens died in Gasselternijveenschemond.
- 2012 in total: 120,000 animals died in eleven fires throughout the Netherlands.
  - 8 August 2012: during two simultaneous but unrelated fires, over a thousand animals died: in Drempt more than 700 sows and piglets and in Aalten more than 300 animals.
- 2013 in total: 69,000 animals died in seventeen fires throughout the Netherlands.
  - 18 April 2013: over 5,000 pigs died in Spoordonk.
- 2014 in total: 32,000 animals died in fourteen fires throughout the Netherlands.
  - 5 April 2014: 2,000 perished in Langeveen.
- 2015 in total: 160,000 animals were killed in fires across the Netherlands, including 4,105 pigs in five fires, and 129,000 chickens in three fires.
- 2016 in total: 202,000 animals died across the Netherlands, including 13,592 pigs in four fires, and 185,000 chickens in five fires.
  - 6 April 2016: 10,000 piglets perished in Oirschot.
  - 10 June 2016: 2,000 pigs died in Kruisland.
  - 28 July 2016: 1,300 pigs died in Erp.
  - 28 October 2016: 34,000 chicks died in Wintelre.
- 2017 in total: 231,700 animals died across the Netherlands, including 35,352 pigs in eleven fires, and 196,000 chickens in three fires.
  - 6 January 2017: 3,000 pigs died on industrial terrain Bijsterhuizen in Nijmegen.
  - 15 February 2017: 2,000 pigs died in Mill.
  - 16 June 2017: 80,000 chickens died in Woudenberg.
  - 6 July 2017: 4,000 pigs perished in Heeswijk-Dinther.
  - 15 July 2017: 76,000 chickens died in Nederweert; the chickens that survived, were killed the next day by the order of the Netherlands Food and Consumer Product Safety Authority (NVWA).
  - 27 July 2017: at least 20,000 pigs died at De Knorhof in Erichem. Never before in the Netherlands had so many pigs lost their lives in a single fire.
  - 14 August 2017: 9,000 pigs (1,000 sows, 8,000 piglets) died in Groot Agelo.
  - 16 August 2017: 40,000 chickens perished in Swifterbant.
- 2018 in total: 122,000 animals died in twenty fires across the Netherlands.
  - 21 February 2018: 30,000 died in Woudenberg.
  - 10 May 2018: 23,000 chickens died in Ospel.
  - 31 July 2018: 2,500 pigs died in Didam.
  - 23 October 2018: 4,000 piglets perished in Heusden, Asten.
  - 28 October 2018: 20,000 chickens died Barneveld.
- 2019: 176,000 animals died in fourteen fires throughout the Netherlands.
  - 1 February 2019: 2,500 pigs died in Biezenmortel.
  - 30 April 2019: 16,000 chickens died in Renswoude.
  - 7 July 2019: 100,000 chickens died in Kiel-Windeweer.
  - 15 August 2019: 42,000 chickens died in Niawier.
  - 22 August 2019: 16,000 chickens died in Nijkerk.
  - 22 August 2019: 1,500 pigs died in Streefkerk.
- 2020: 108,794 animals died in 26 fires throughout the Netherlands.
  - 21 February 2020: Between 38,000 and 45,000 chickens died in Bentelo.
  - 24 March 2020: 8000 turkeys died in Biddinghuizen.
  - 17 April 2020: 1,000 pigs died in Lierop.
  - 11 May 2020: 24,000 chickens died in Harskamp.
  - 13 June 2020: Approx. 20,000 chickens died in Barneveld.
  - 8 August 2020: 14,000 chickens died in Beltrum.
- 2021 6,915 animals died in 12 fires throughout the Netherlands.
  - 1 June 2021: 4600 pigs died in Nederweert.
- 2022
  - 25 April 2022: 43,000 chickens died in Heusden, Asten.
  - 11 May 2022: 25,000 chickens died in Varsen.
  - 19 June 2022: 7,000 ducks died in Markelo.
  - 3 October 2022: 28,500 chickens died in Assen.
  - 10 November 2022: 30,000 chickens died in Putten.

== United Kingdom ==
=== Overview of problems ===
As the frequency of prolonged dry spells increases, the risk of barn fires in the UK is rising.

=== Major barn fires ===
Reported barn fires in the UK in which 50 or more animals died include:

- 2015
  - In May 2015 some 4,000 breeding hens died in a barn fire near Gretna, Dumfries and Galloway.
- 2023
  - On 15 July 2023, a fire killed 32,000 chickens at a farm at Upper Dunsforth, near Boroughbridge.
- 2024
  - 8 July 2024: 400 pigs died in a barn fire in Catwick, East Yorkshire.
- 2025
  - 12 May 2025: Some 800 goats died in a barn fire in Ottringham, East Yorkshire.
  - 29 September 2025: 75 pigs died in a barn fire near Halesworth, Suffolk; many others were rescued.

== United States ==
=== Overview of problems ===
A review of news media reports from 2013 to 2017 identifies a total of 2.7 million animal deaths in 326 barn fires on American territory. This number includes 2.6 million chickens, 71,300 pigs, 34,200 turkeys, 2,600 cows, as well as 1,100 goats and sheep.

Where the cause of the fire is identified, heating equipment is in cause half the time; two-thirds of barn fires occurred between the months of October and March, when the weather is typically colder. This also explains why northeastern and midwestern states account for the largest number of reported barn fires involving animal deaths: New York (31), Pennsylvania (29), Michigan (28), Minnesota (26) and Wisconsin (23). This data is incomplete, as no reporting requirements exist for fires involving farm animals.

One of the National Fire Protection Association's building codes (the NFPA 150) covers specifically animal housing facilities: barns, but also laboratories, kennels, zoos and others. Its latest revision (published in August 2018) puts more emphasis than previous iterations on agricultural facilities. In addition to recommending detection equipment that is currently missing from most installations, the NFPA advocates prevention measures, such as training for employees, inspections and the reduction of combustibles present in and around the facilities to limit the risk of destructive fires. The adoption of the NFPA's recommendations by local government, industry and certification programs is voluntary.

Farm animals are not covered by the federal Animal Welfare Act, which provides some protection to animals in zoos and laboratories, for example.

=== Major barn fires ===
Reported barn fires in which over 1,000 animals died include:

- 1 February 2014: 280,000 chickens died in La Grange, Wisconsin.
- 30 March 2014: 150,000 chickens died in Galt, Iowa.
- 2 October 2014: 4,000 pigs died in Eagle Springs, North Carolina.
- 27 October 2014: 11,000 pigs died near Truman, Minnesota.
- 30 May 2016: 5,000 pigs died near Hawarden, Iowa.
- 11 June 2017: 134,000 chicks died in Hawley, Minnesota.
- 3 July 2017: 100,000 chickens died in Tyrone, Pennsylvania.
- 7 September 2017: 300,000 chickens died in Toole County, Utah.
- 2 October 2017: 1 million chickens died in North Manchester, Indiana.
- 8 December 2017: 2,000 chickens died in Bush Creek, Tennessee.
- 14 December 2017: 6,500 pigs and piglets died in Emmet County, Iowa.
- 26 February 2018: 14,000 chickens died in Mount Vernon, Washington.
- 4 May 2018: 8,000 pigs died near Frazee, Minnesota.
- 18 June 2018: 25,000 chickens died in Tenino, Washington.
- 5 April 2019: 22,000 chickens died in Tecumseh, Nebraska.
- 1 May 2019: 250,000 chickens died near Saranac, Michigan.
- 7 June 2019: 25,000 chickens died in Goshen, Alabama.
- 2 November 2019: 12,500 chickens died in Roaring River (North Carolina).
- 26 November 2019: 19,000 chickens died in Moore County, North Carolina.
- 2020: More than 1.6 million farm animals died in barn fires.
- 2021: More than 681,000 farm animals died in barn fires.
- 2022: More than half a million farm animals died in barn fires.
- 10 April 2023: 18,000 cows died in Dimmitt, Texas.
- 29 May 2024: 1.3 million chickens killed in Marion County, Illinois.
- 2025: 573,910 Farmed Animals were killed in barn fires, including 200,000 Chickens in a fire at New Paris, Ohio on 3 February.
