= Agelo =

Groot Agelo
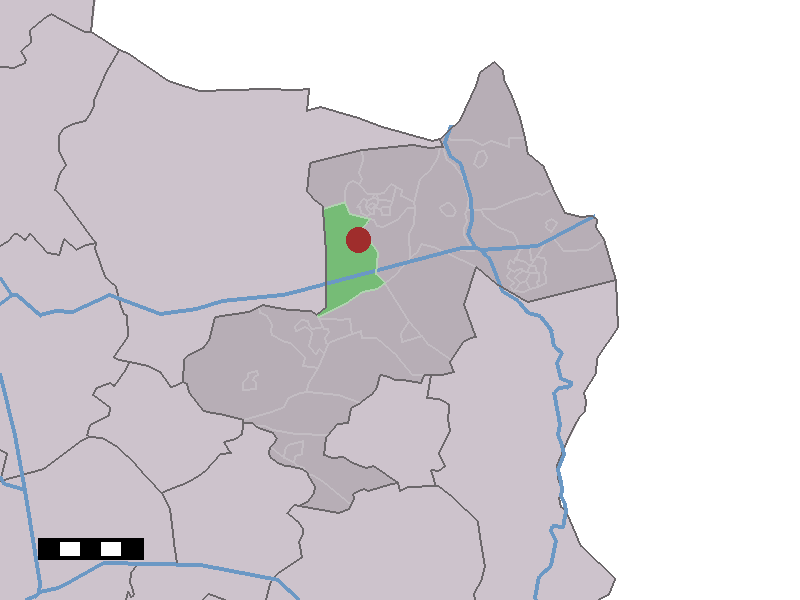
- Coordinates: 52°23′33″N 6°53′10″E
- Country: Netherlands
- Province: Overijssel
- Municipality: Dinkelland

Population
  - Total: 380

Agelo usually refers to two neighbouring towns in the Dutch province of Overijssel:

- Groot Agelo
- Klein Agelo

Since 2009, both hamlets are listed under Agelo.
