= Listed buildings in Dunsforths =

Dunsforths is a civil parish in the county of North Yorkshire, England. It contains five listed buildings that are recorded in the National Heritage List for England. All the listed buildings are designated at Grade II, the lowest of the three grades, which is applied to "buildings of national importance and special interest". The parish contains the villages of Lower Dunsforth and Upper Dunsforth, and the surrounding area. All the listed buildings are in Lower Dunsforth, and consist of a church, a former vicarage and associated structures, a farmhouse and a farm building.

== Buildings ==
Name and location	Photograph	Date	Notes
Dovecote south of Manor Farm House; 54.07639°N 1.32796°W	—	c. 1800	This consists of a cartshed and stable or byre with a dovecote above. There is one bay and two storeys, and a square plan. The lower part is in cobble and sandstone, the upper part is in red brick, and it has a pantile roof. In the ground floor are doorways and a cart entry, and above are doveholes and landing platforms in semicircular recessed panels.
Mattisons Farm House; 54.07729°N 1.33044°W	—	c. 1830	The farmhouse is in mottled brick, and has a slate roof with coped gables. There are two storeys and three bays. In the centre is a doorway with a patterned fanlight, the windows are sashes, and all the openings have painted wedge lintels.
St Mary's Church; 54.07789°N 1.32413°W		1860	The church is in sandstone with stone slate roofs. It consists of a nave, a lower chancel with a north organ chamber and vestry, and a southwest steeple. The steeple has a tower with three stages, buttresses, and a porch with a pointed arch and a double-chamfered surround and a hood mould. To the west is a stair tower, the bottom stage contains a cusped lancet window, and above are rectangular lights, clock faces with hood moulds, paired bell openings, a chamfered string course, and a band of trefoil tracery, and the tower is surmounted by a broach spire with a wrought iron weathervane.
The Old Vicarage, wall and gate piers 54.07784°N 1.32516°W	—	1866	The vicarage, later a private house, is in pink and cream mottled brick with bands of vitreous blue brick, dressings in sandstone, a plinth band, quoins, and a slate roof. The entrance front has two storeys and four bays. The doorway is arched, with moulded imposts, and the windows are sashes with quoined surrounds. The garden front has five bays, and contains a canted bay window. The stableyard walls are about 3 metres (9.8 ft) high, with flat coping, and are ramped up to the gate piers that have conical caps.
Stable block, The Old Vicarage; 54.07799°N 1.32533°W	—	1866	The stable block is in pink and cream mottled brick with bands of vitreous blue brick, sandstone bands, and a slate roof. There is one storey and a loft, and three bays. In the ground floor are double doors under a semicircular relieving arch, and a doorway and a sash window, both with cambered brick arches. Above is a shuttered pitching window.
