= Heusden (disambiguation) =

Heusden may refer to several places:

- Heusden, a municipality and a city in the Netherlands
- Heusden, Asten, a village in Asten, Netherlands
- Opheusden or Heusden, in Gelderland, Netherlands
- Heusden, Belgium, a former municipality in East Flanders, Belgium
- Heusden-Zolder, a municipality in Limburg, Belgium
