= Erichem =

- Village
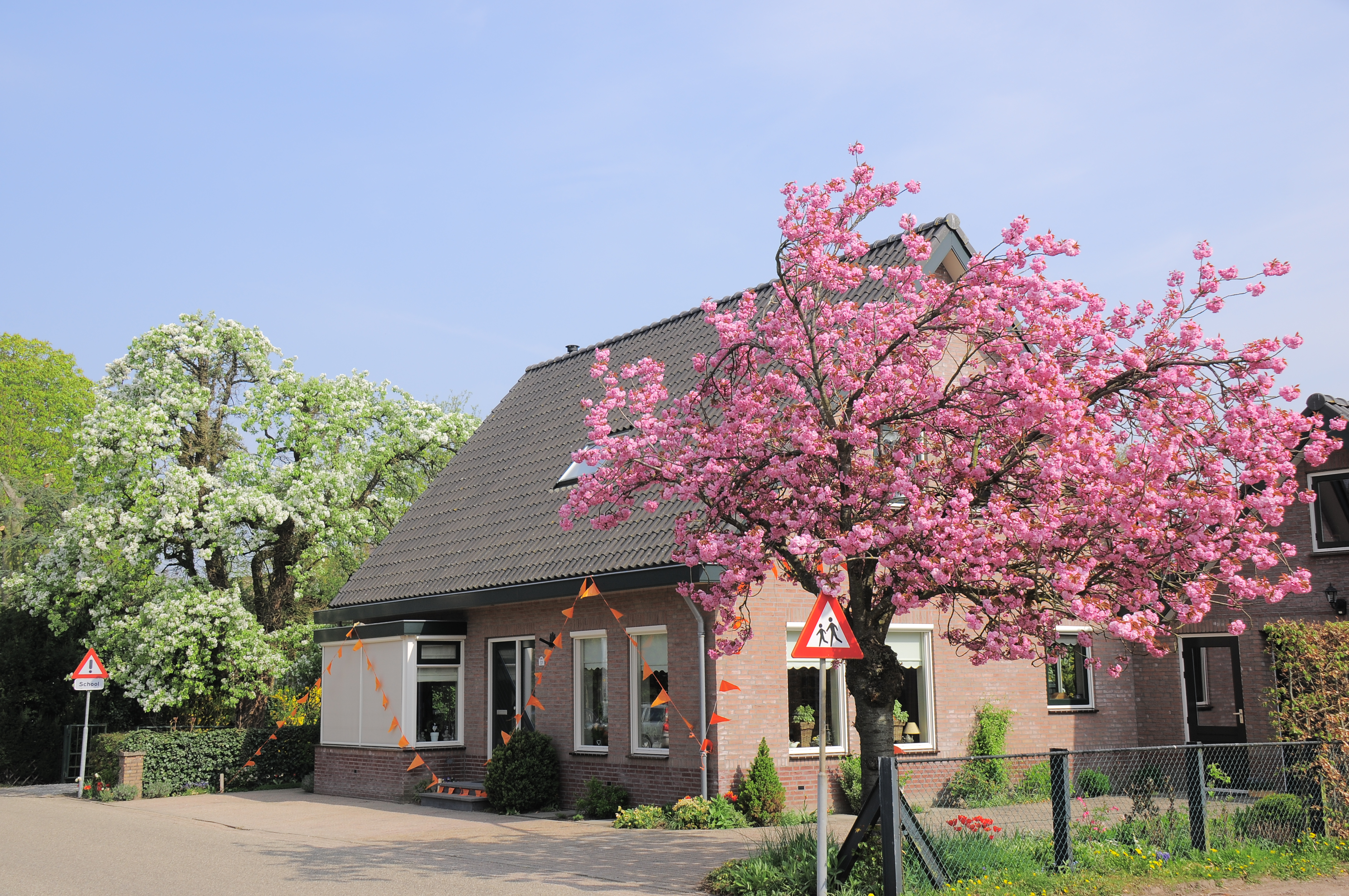
- Erichem in bloom

- Location in the province of Gelderland Erichem (Netherlands)
- Coordinates: 51.8984°N 5.3478°E
- Country: Netherlands
- Province: Gelderland
- Municipality: Buren

Area
  - Total: 6.11 km^{2} (2.36 sq mi)
- Elevation: 4 m (13 ft)

Population (2021)
  - Total: 395
  - Density: 64.6/km^{2} (167/sq mi)
- Time zone: UTC+1 (CET)
  - Summer (DST): UTC+2 (CEST)
- Postal code: 4115
- Dialing code: 0345

Erichem is a village in the Dutch province of Gelderland. It is a part of the municipality of Buren, and lies about 5 km west of Tiel.

It was first mentioned in 850 as Ermkina, and means "settlement of the people of Ero or Eric (person)". The village developed along a former stream as a stretched out esdorp. The St. Joris Church has a 14th-century tower with a 13th-century base. The church dates from around 1500. In 1840, it was home to 438 people.

In 2017, a barn fire in Erichem killed approximately 20,000 pigs. Animal welfare groups launched protests against large scale animal husbandry. In 2019, the farmer announced plans to rebuild. The new barn would house 29,000 pigs.

== Gallery ==
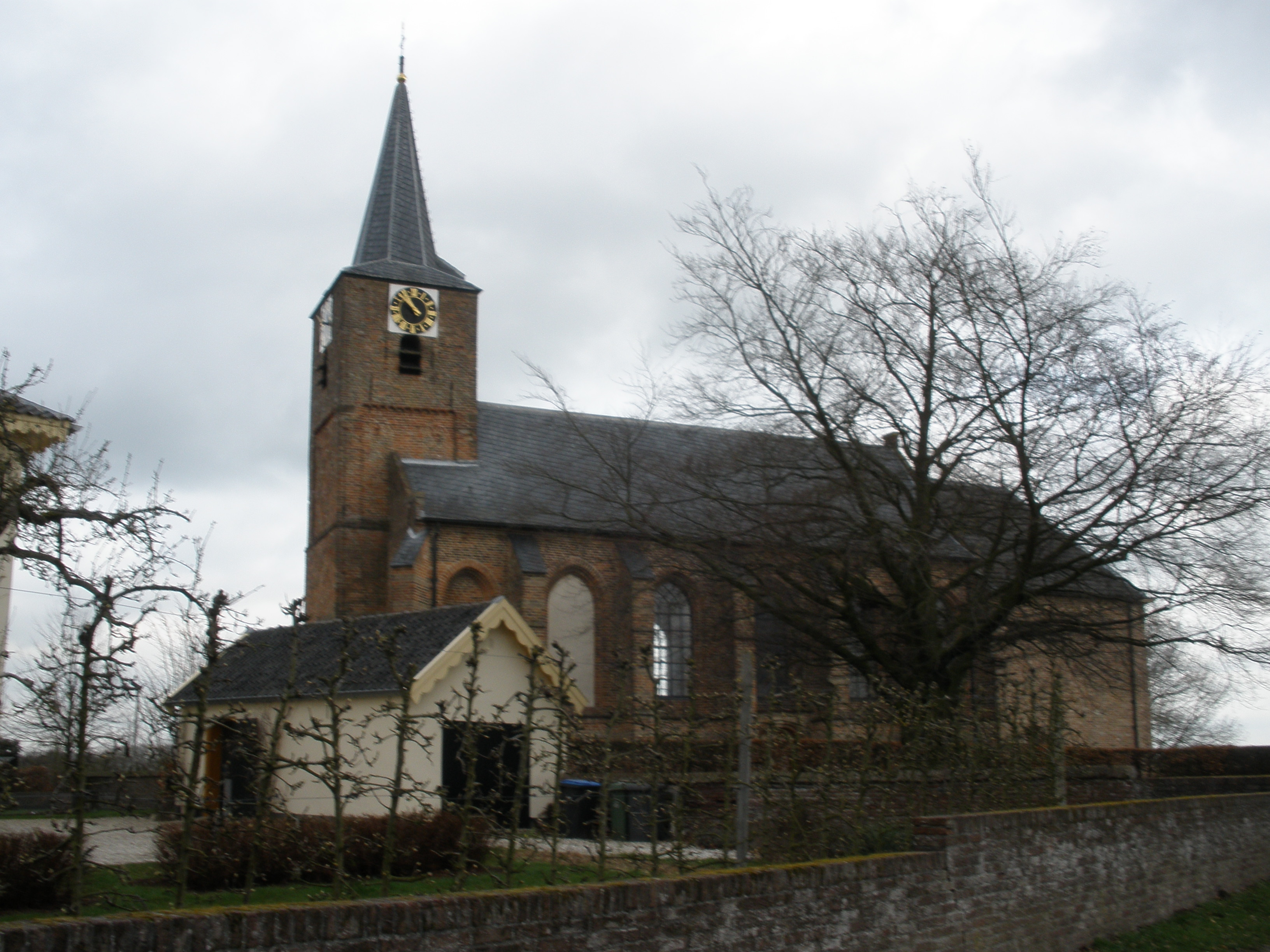
St Joris Church

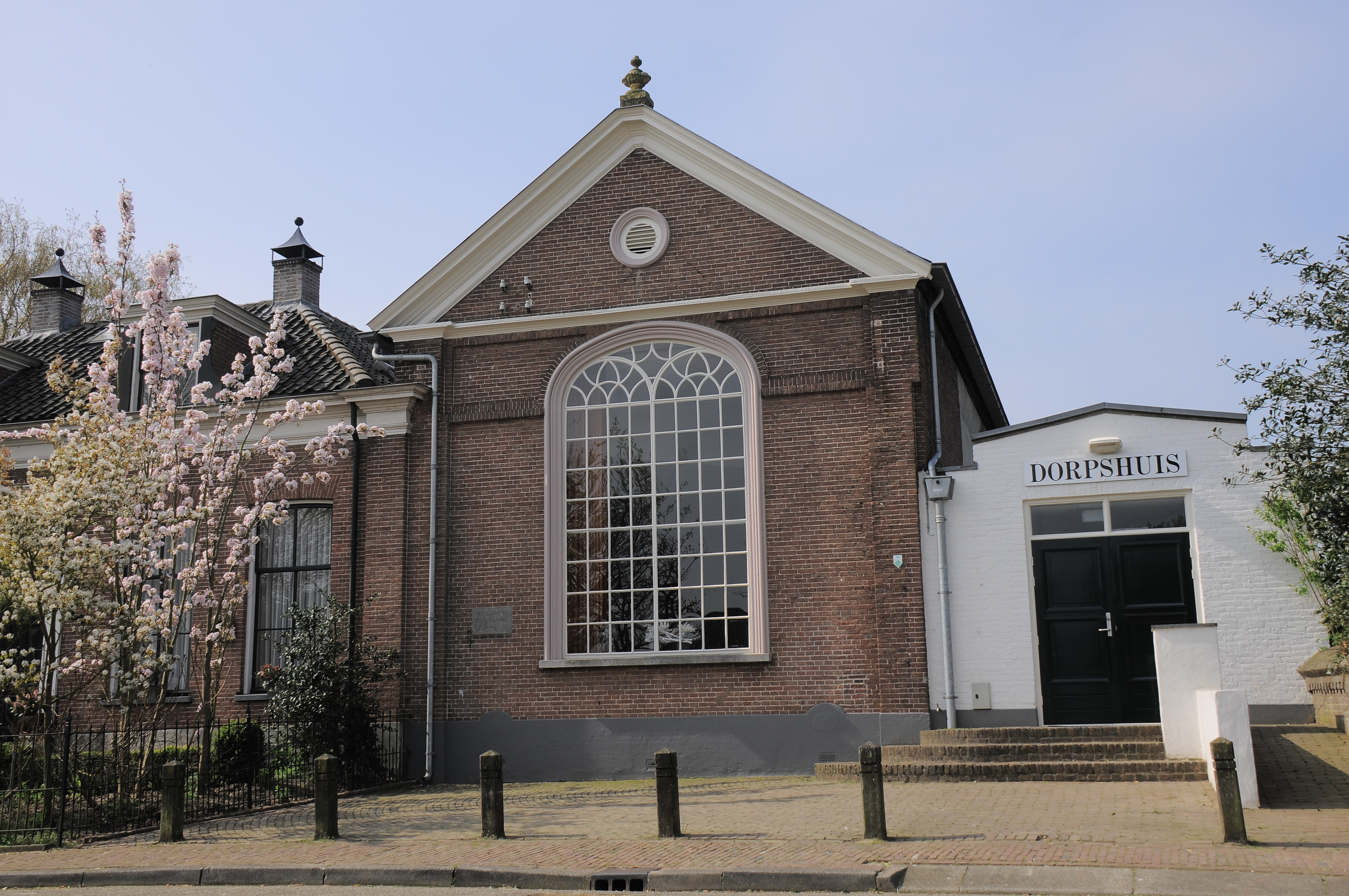
Village house

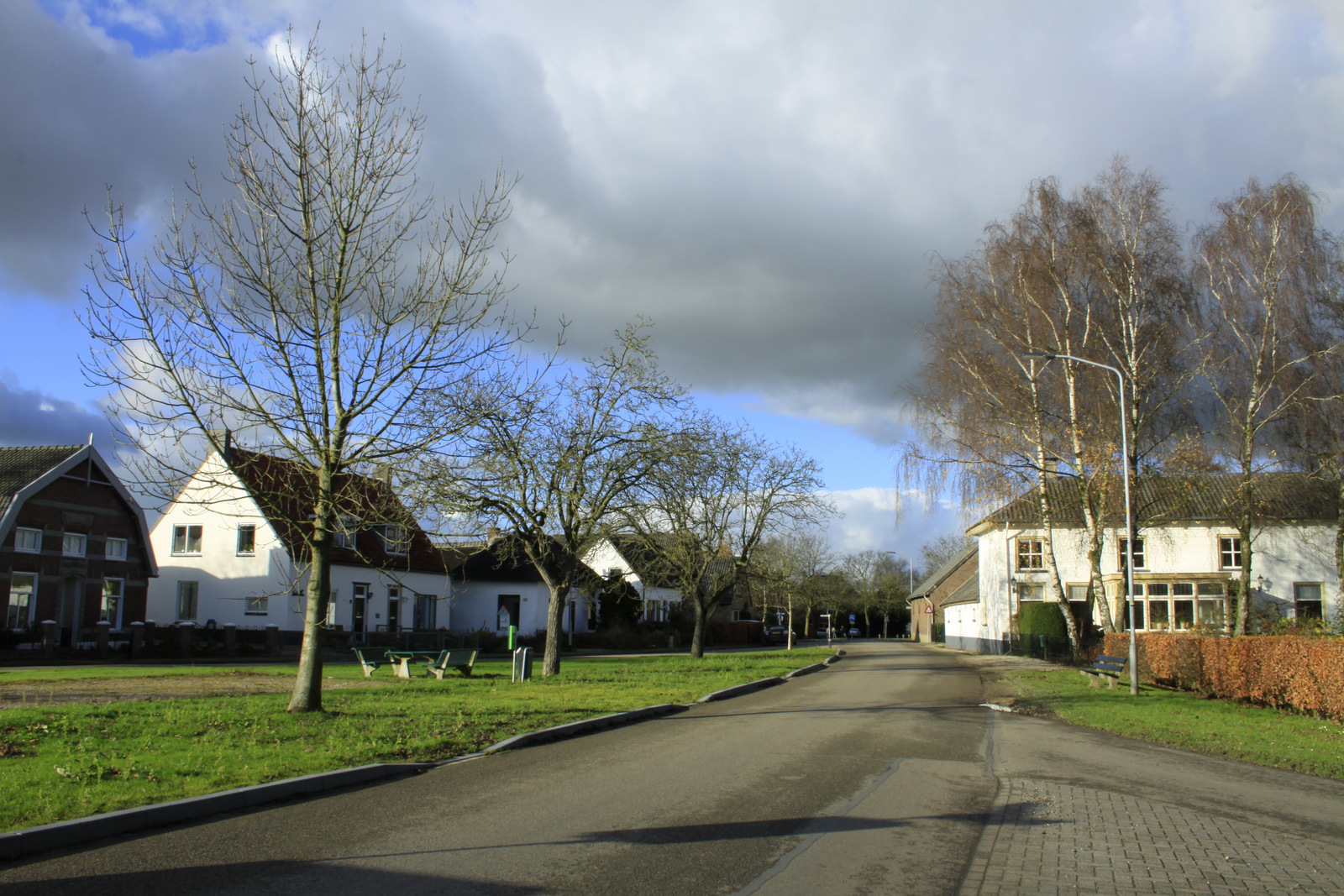
Street view

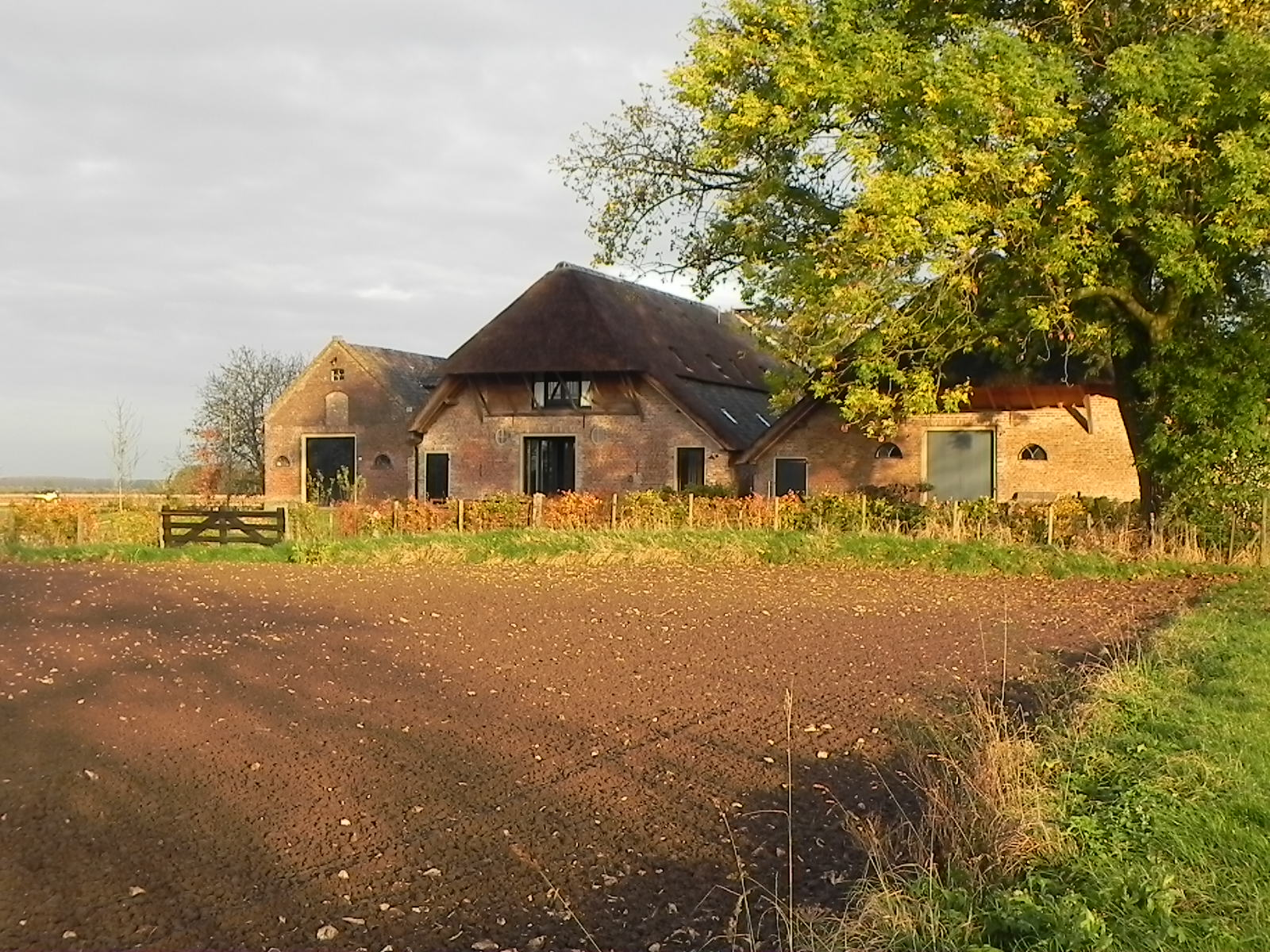
Farm Lingestein
