= Dunsforths =

Civil parish in North Yorkshire, England

Coordinates: 54.077°N 1.327°W

- Location within North Yorkshire
- Population: 224 (2011 census)
- Unitary authority: North Yorkshire
- Ceremonial county: North Yorkshire
- Region: Yorkshire and the Humber
- Country: England
- Sovereign state: United Kingdom
- Post town: HARROGATE
- Postcode district: YO26
- Dialling code: 01423
- Police: North Yorkshire
- Fire: North Yorkshire
- Ambulance: Yorkshire
- UK Parliament: Skipton and Ripon

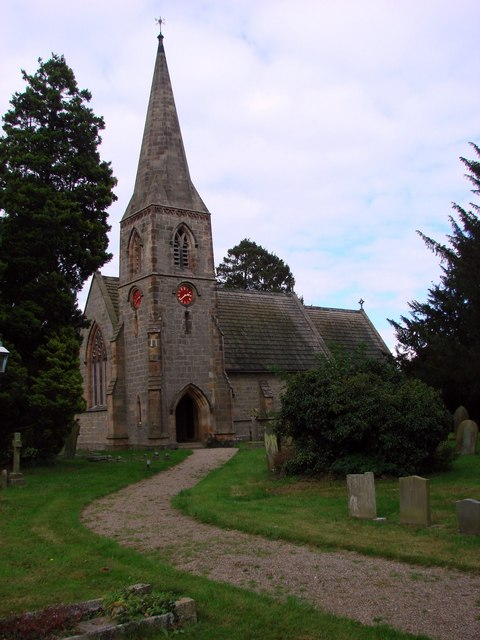
Picture of church in lower Dunsforth

Dunsforths is a civil parish in the county of North Yorkshire, England. In 2011, the civil parish had 224 inhabitants. It consists of Lower Dunsforth and Upper Dunsforth.

From 1974 to 2023 it was part of the Borough of Harrogate, it is now administered by the unitary North Yorkshire Council.

== See also ==
- Listed buildings in Dunsforths
