= St Mary's Church, Dunsforth =

Church in Lower Dunsforth, North Yorkshire, England

Coordinates: 54°04′40″N 1°19′27″W

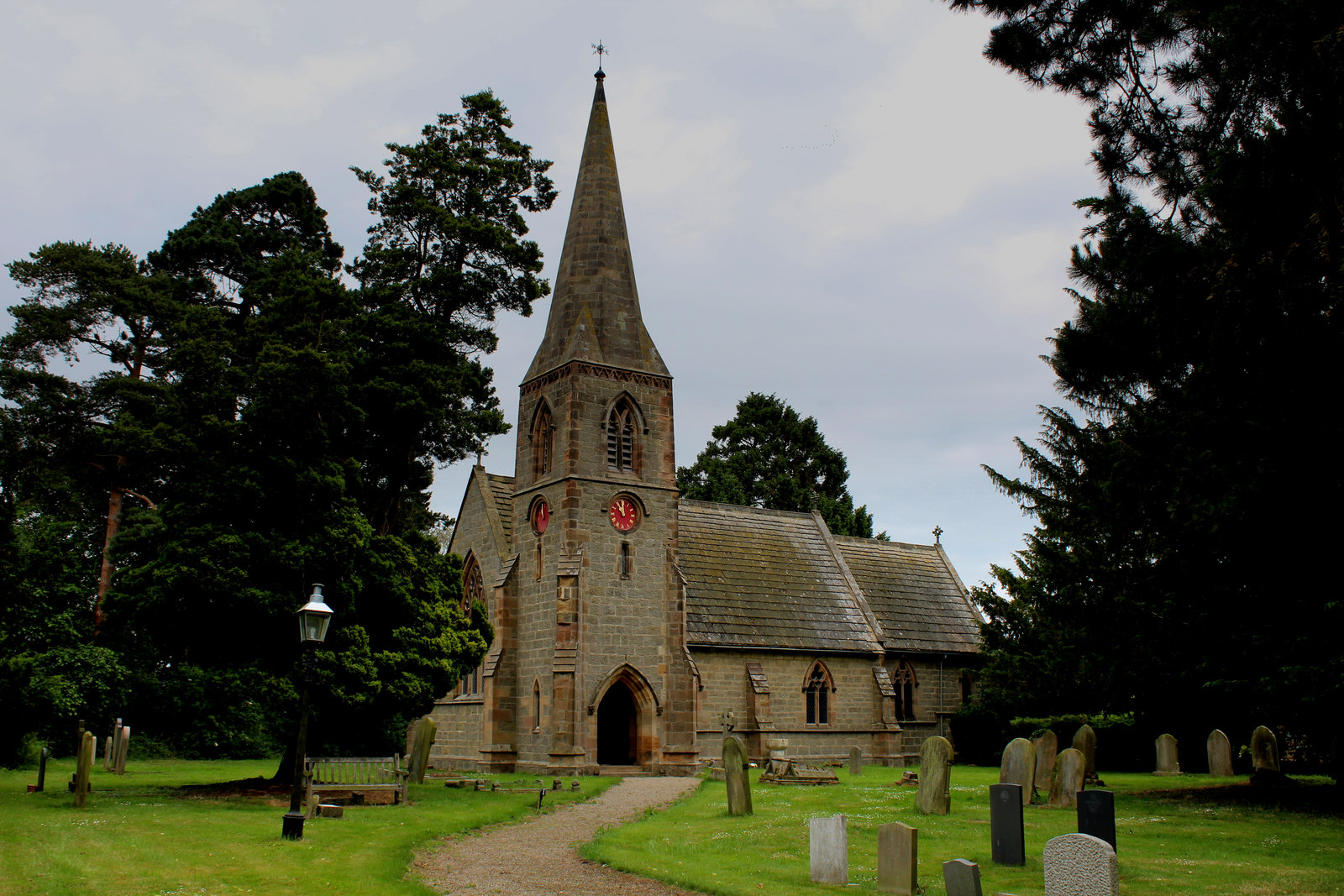
The church, in 2015

St Mary's Church is an Anglican church in Lower Dunsforth, a village in North Yorkshire, in England.

There was a mediaeval church in Dunsforth, in the Romanesque style. It was demolished in 1860, and a new church was designed by James Mallinson and Thomas Healey and completed the following year. It incorporated parts of the doorway from the original church, along with a capital and a broken font. The building was grade II listed in 1988.

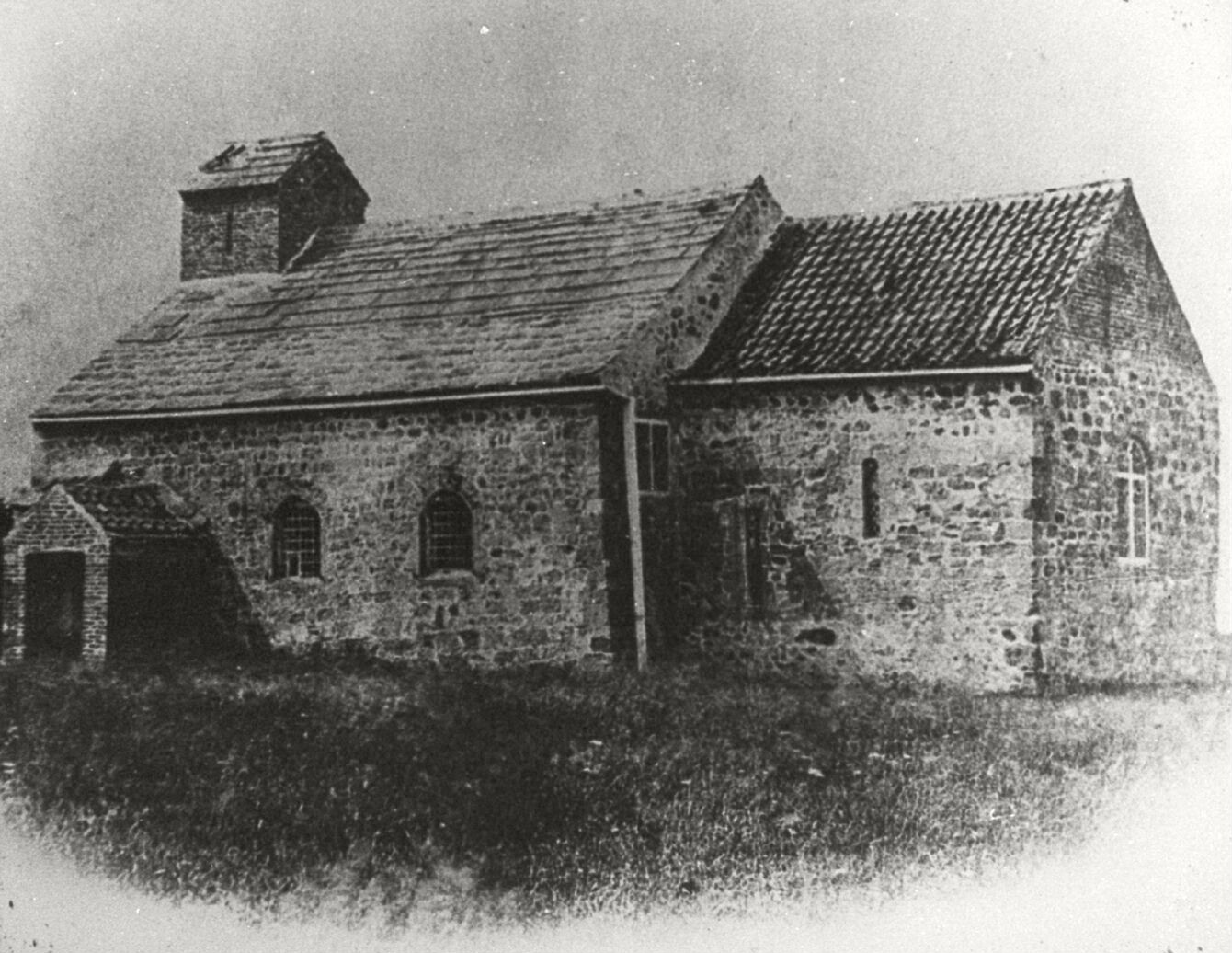
The old church, in 1860

The church is in sandstone with stone slate roofs. It consists of a nave, a lower chancel with a north organ chamber and vestry, and a southwest steeple. The steeple has a tower with three stages, buttresses, and a porch with a pointed arch and a double-chamfered surround and a hood mould. To the west is a stair tower, the bottom stage contains a cusped lancet window, and above are rectangular lights, clock faces with hood moulds, paired bell openings, a chamfered string course, and a band of trefoil tracery, and the tower is surmounted by a broach spire with a wrought iron weathervane.

== See also ==
- Listed buildings in Dunsforths
