= Grammene =

Village in Belgium

Coordinates: 50°58′41″N 3°28′08″E

Location of Grammene

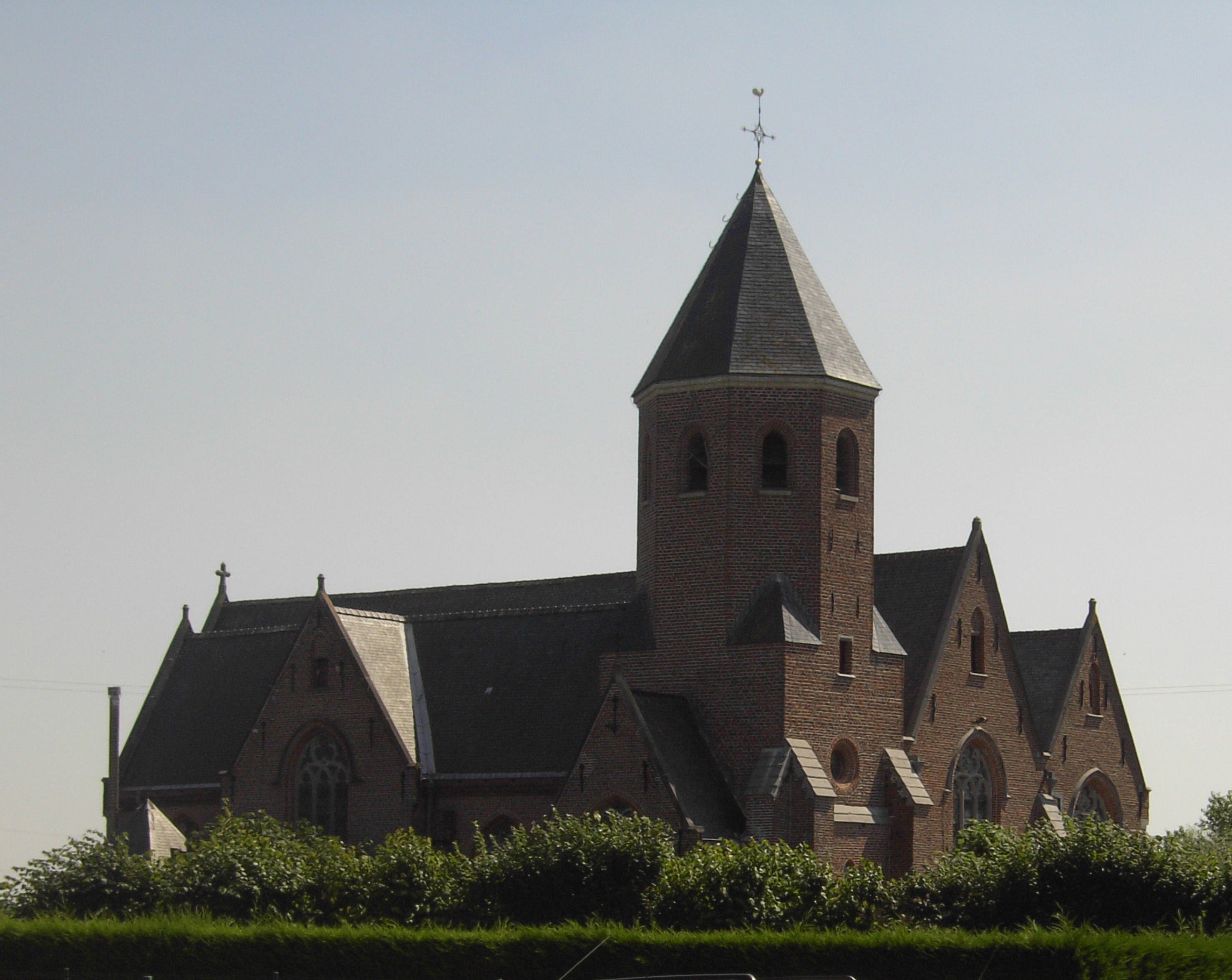
Church of Grammene

Grammene is a village in the Belgian province of East Flanders and is a submunicipality of Deinze. It was an independent municipality until the municipal reorganization of 1977. Grammene is a rural village on the Lys river and the Oude Mandel. The village had 646 inhabitants in 1981.

The oldest mention of Grimmine is from 1121. Its name is said to be derived from the old Germanic grimminja. The lordship of Grammene, dependent on the fiefdom of Kortrijk, belonged to the family de Grammina in the 12th and 13th centuries. Later lords were Van Schuurvelde (14th century), de Tolenaare (end of the 14th century), de Beer (second half of the 15th century to first half of the 17th century), Vanden Heede (first half of the 17th century) and the barons of Poeke (18th century). Administratively and fiscally it belonged to the castellany of Kortrijk, in ecclesiastical matters it depended on the bishopric of Tournai until 1559, afterwards on the bishopric of Ghent, deanery of Tielt. The right of patronage belonged to the Ghent Saint Bavo's Abbey since 1121, afterwards on the bishopric of Ghent.

During the World War I the first schepen Charles Baerens was killed by the Germans. Later the parish of Grammene was destroyed after a suspected assassination attempt.
