= Wakker Dier =

Dutch animal welfare organisation

Wakker Dier (lit. 'awoken animal') is a Dutch animal welfare organisation. Its main purpose is putting an end to factory farming. Wakker Dier was founded in 1997 and fused with the organisation Lekker Dier in 2001, but the name didn't change. Marianne Thieme was the foundation's president from 2004 to 2006. Wakker Dier has had several successful campaigns, most notably the one against battery cages (since 2003 super markets stopped selling eggs from chickens raised there) and the one against the castrating of conscious pigs (Hema and Unox have said they will stop selling meat from unanaesthetised pigs by 2009).
