= Klein Agelo =

- Hamlet
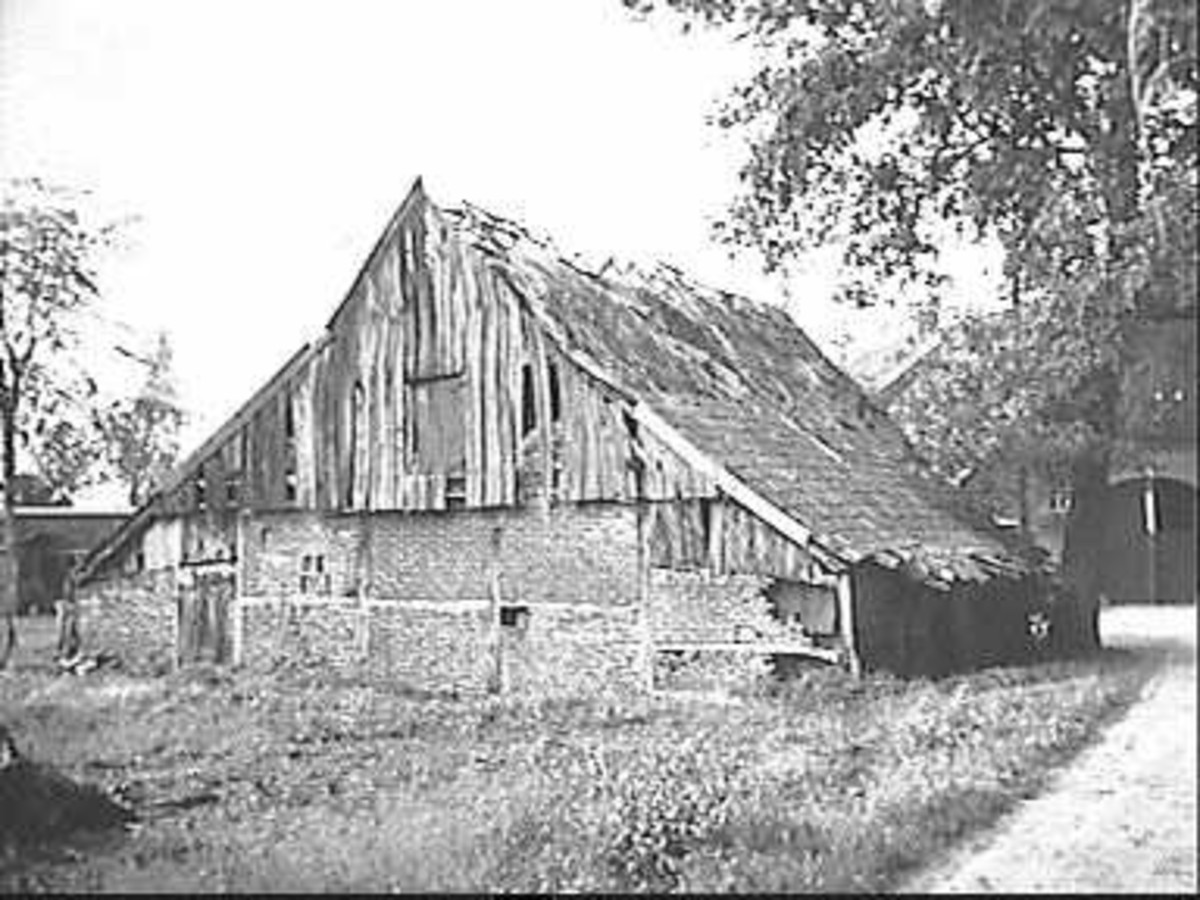
- Old style barn

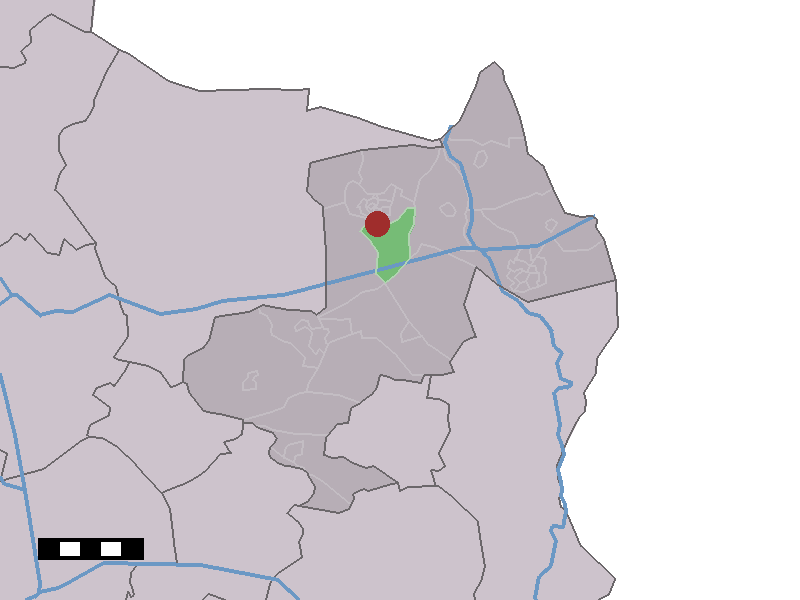
- The village (dark red) and the statistical district (light green) of Klein Agelo in the municipality of Dinkelland.

- Location in the Netherlands Klein Agelo (Netherlands)
- Coordinates: 52°24′0″N 6°54′0″E
- Country: Netherlands
- Province: Overijssel
- Municipality: Dinkelland

Area
  - Total: 5.92 km^{2} (2.29 sq mi)
- Elevation: 21 m (69 ft)

Population (2021)
  - Total: 215
  - Density: 36.3/km^{2} (94.1/sq mi)
- Time zone: UTC+1 (CET)
  - Summer (DST): UTC+2 (CEST)
- Postal code: 7636
- Dialing code: 0541

Klein Agelo is a hamlet in the Dutch province of Overijssel. It is a part of the municipality of Dinkelland, and lies about 10 km north of Oldenzaal and very close to Ootmarsum.

It was first mentioned in 1408 as "Luttiken Agele". It is called Klein (Little) to distinguish from Groot Agelo (Big). Since 2009, both hamlets are listed under Agelo. Klein Agelo is mentioned on direction signs, however there are no place name signs to indicate that you have arrived in the hamlet.

In the rural countryside some good examples can be found of timber framed barns and farmhouses build in the local traditional style of the Low German house.

== Gallery ==
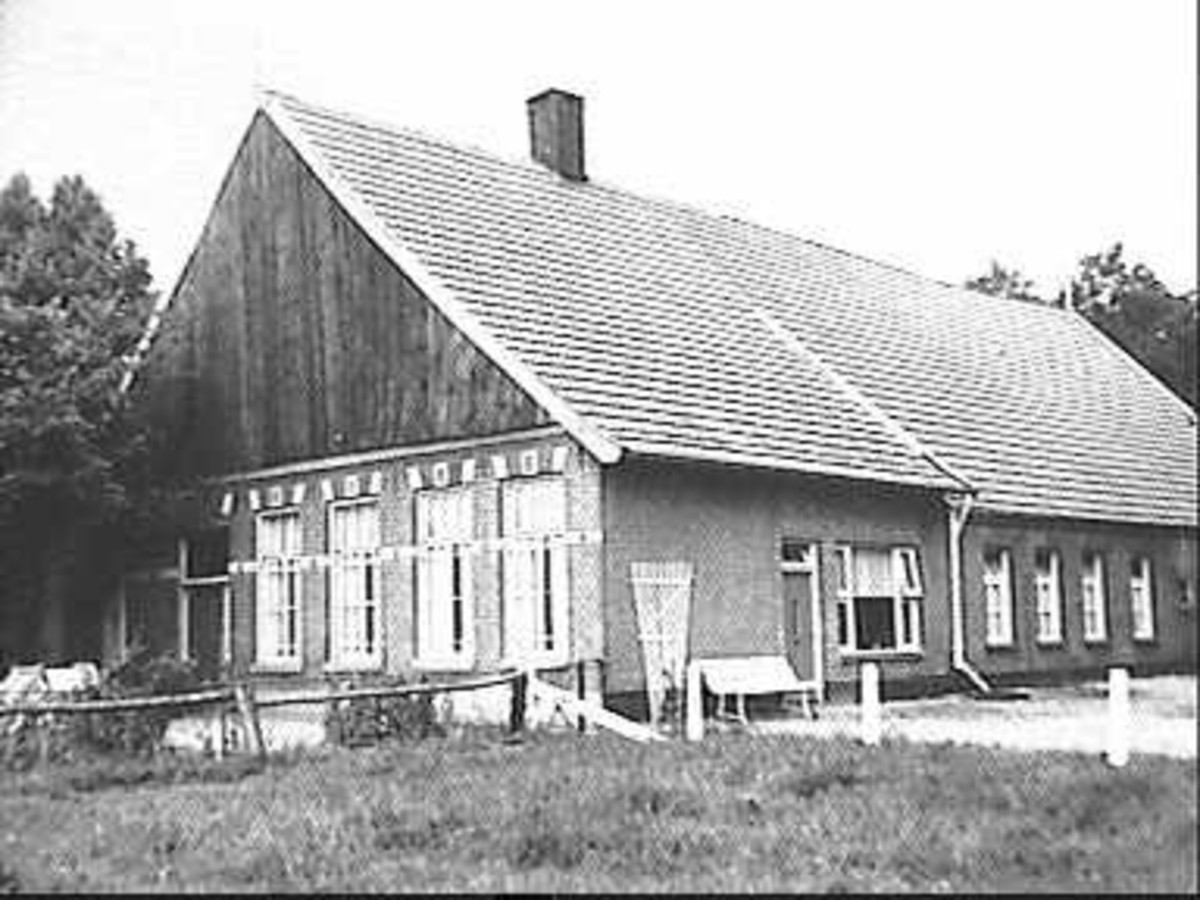
Old style cottage

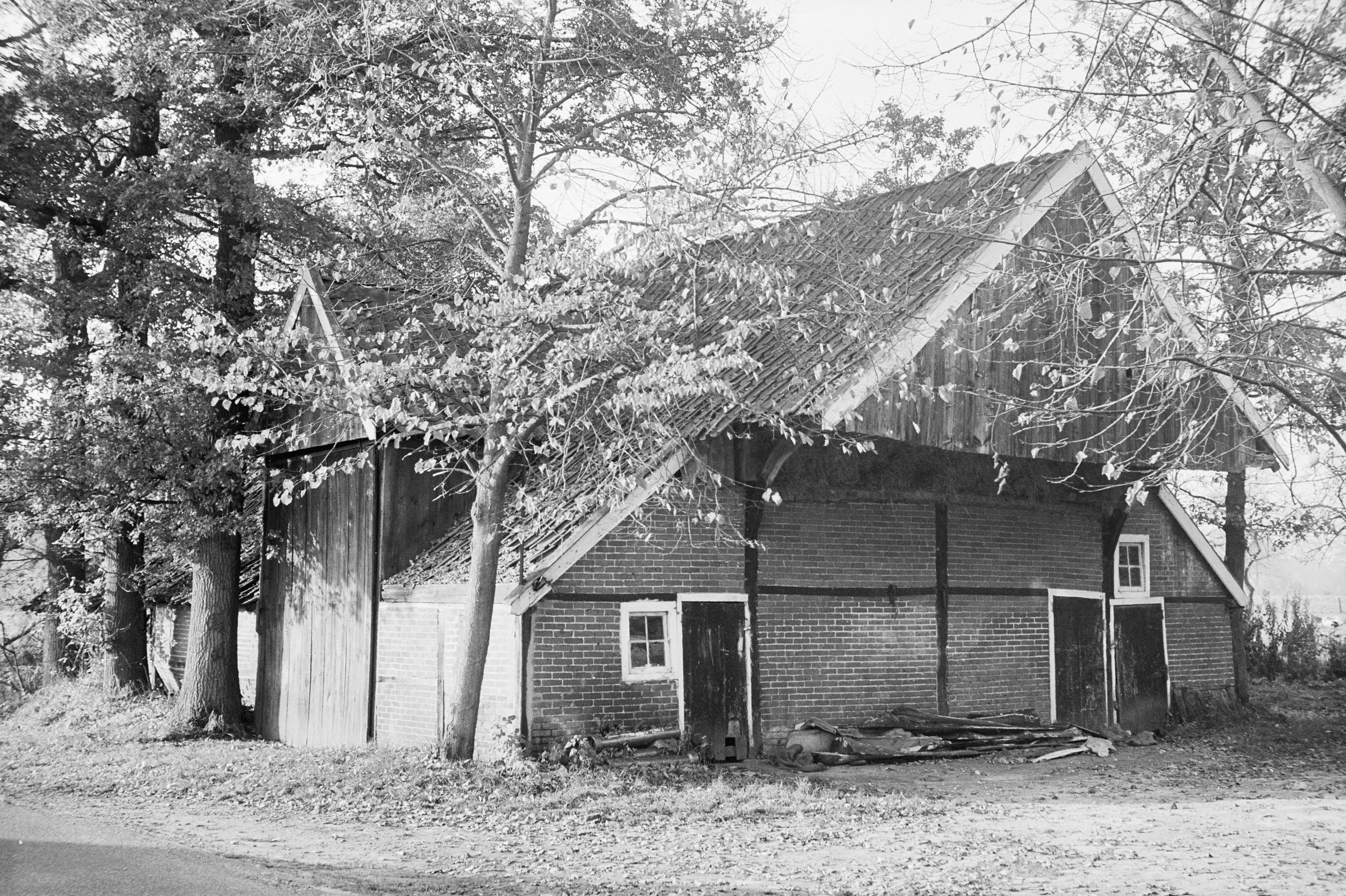
Old style barn

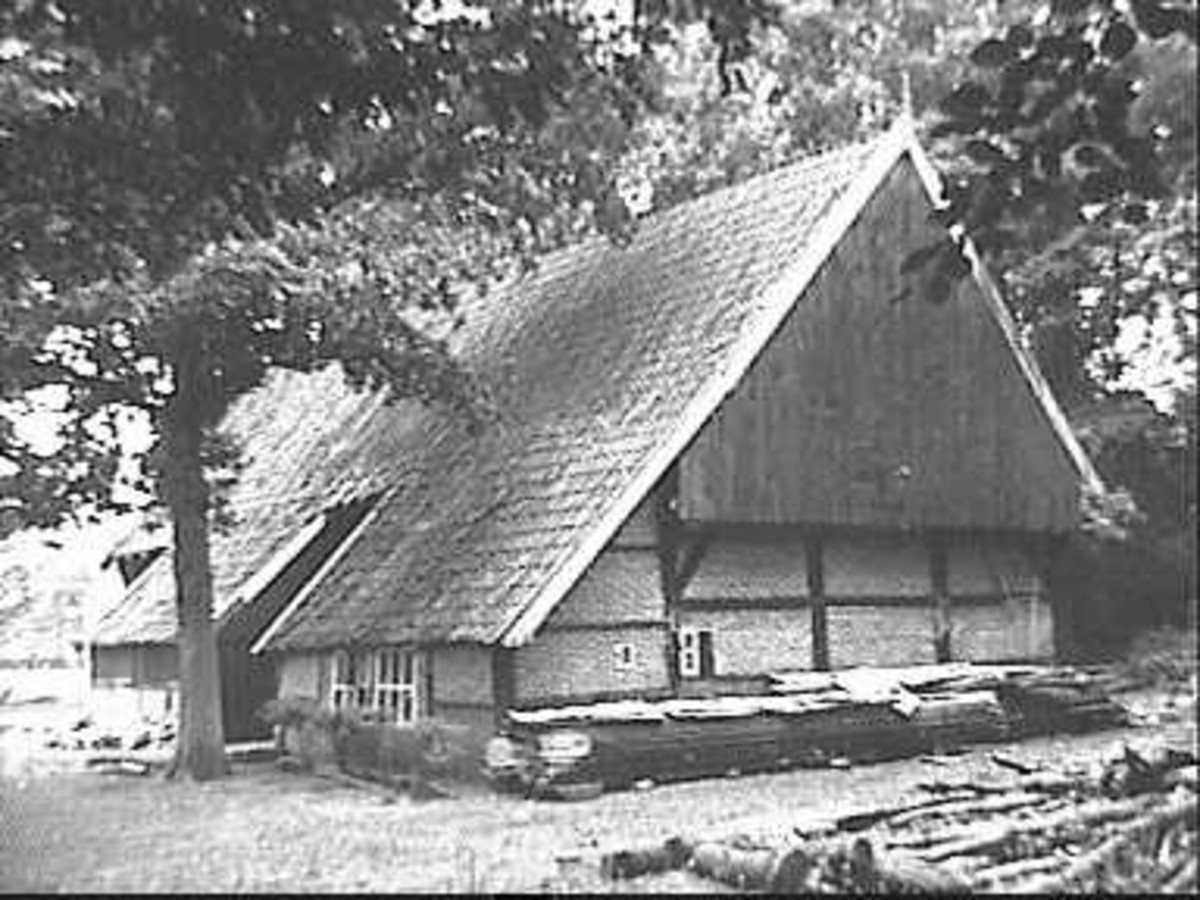
Old style barn
