= Lower Dunsforth =

Village in North Yorkshire, England

Coordinates: 54°04′38″N 1°19′42″W

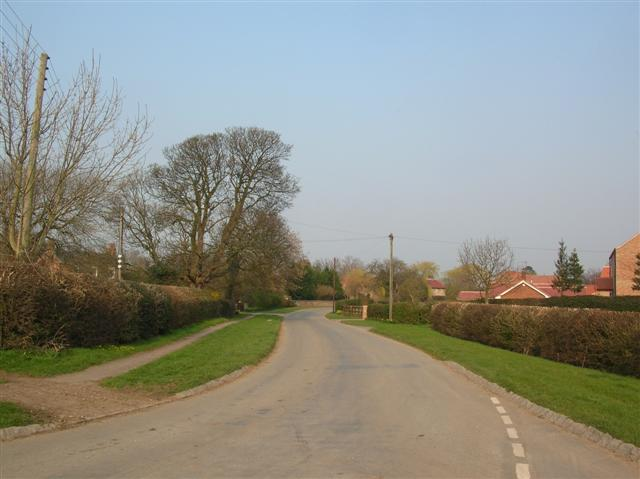
- Lower Dunsforth from the west

- Location within North Yorkshire
- OS grid reference: SE4464
- Civil parish: Dunsforths
- Unitary authority: North Yorkshire
- Ceremonial county: North Yorkshire
- Region: Yorkshire and the Humber
- Country: England
- Sovereign state: United Kingdom
- Post town: HARROGATE
- Postcode district: YO26
- Dialling code: 01423
- Police: North Yorkshire
- Fire: North Yorkshire
- Ambulance: Yorkshire
- UK Parliament: Harrogate and Knaresborough

Lower Dunsforth is a village in the civil parish of Dunsforths, in North Yorkshire, England. It was recorded in the Domesday Book (1086) as Doneforde/Dunesford/Dunesforde. St Mary's Church was rebuilt in the 1860s with a buttressed spire.

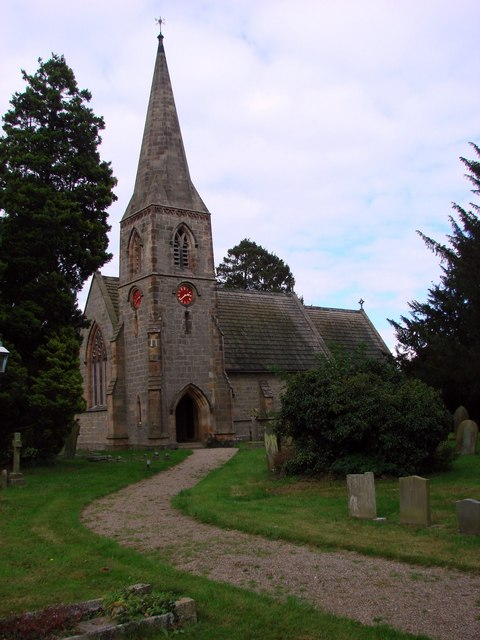
St Mary's church

Lower Dunsforth was formerly a township in the parish of Aldborough, in 1866 Lower Dunsforth became a separate civil parish, on 1 April 1960 the parish was abolished and merged with Upper Dunsforth with Branton Green to form "Dunsforths". In 1951 the parish had a population of 113. From 1974 to 2023 it was part of the Borough of Harrogate, it is now administered by the unitary North Yorkshire Council.
