= Upper Dunsforth =

Village in North Yorkshire, England

Coordinates: 54°3′47.5″N 1°19′36.2″W

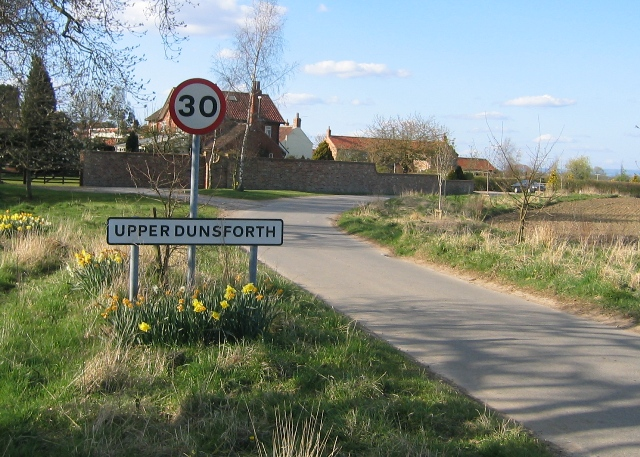
- Entrance to the village

- Location within North Yorkshire
- OS grid reference: SE4463
- Civil parish: Dunsforths
- Unitary authority: North Yorkshire
- Ceremonial county: North Yorkshire
- Region: Yorkshire and the Humber
- Country: England
- Sovereign state: United Kingdom
- Post town: HARROGATE
- Postcode district: YO26
- Dialling code: 01423
- Police: North Yorkshire
- Fire: North Yorkshire
- Ambulance: Yorkshire
- UK Parliament: Skipton and Ripon

Upper Dunsforth is a village in located in the civil parish of Dunsforths, in the county of North Yorkshire, England. It was mentioned in the Domesday Book (1086) as Doneforde/Dunesford/Dunesforde.

Until 1974 it was part of the West Riding of Yorkshire. From 1974 to 2023 it was part of the Borough of Harrogate, it is now administered by the unitary North Yorkshire Council.
