= Groot Agelo =

- Hamlet
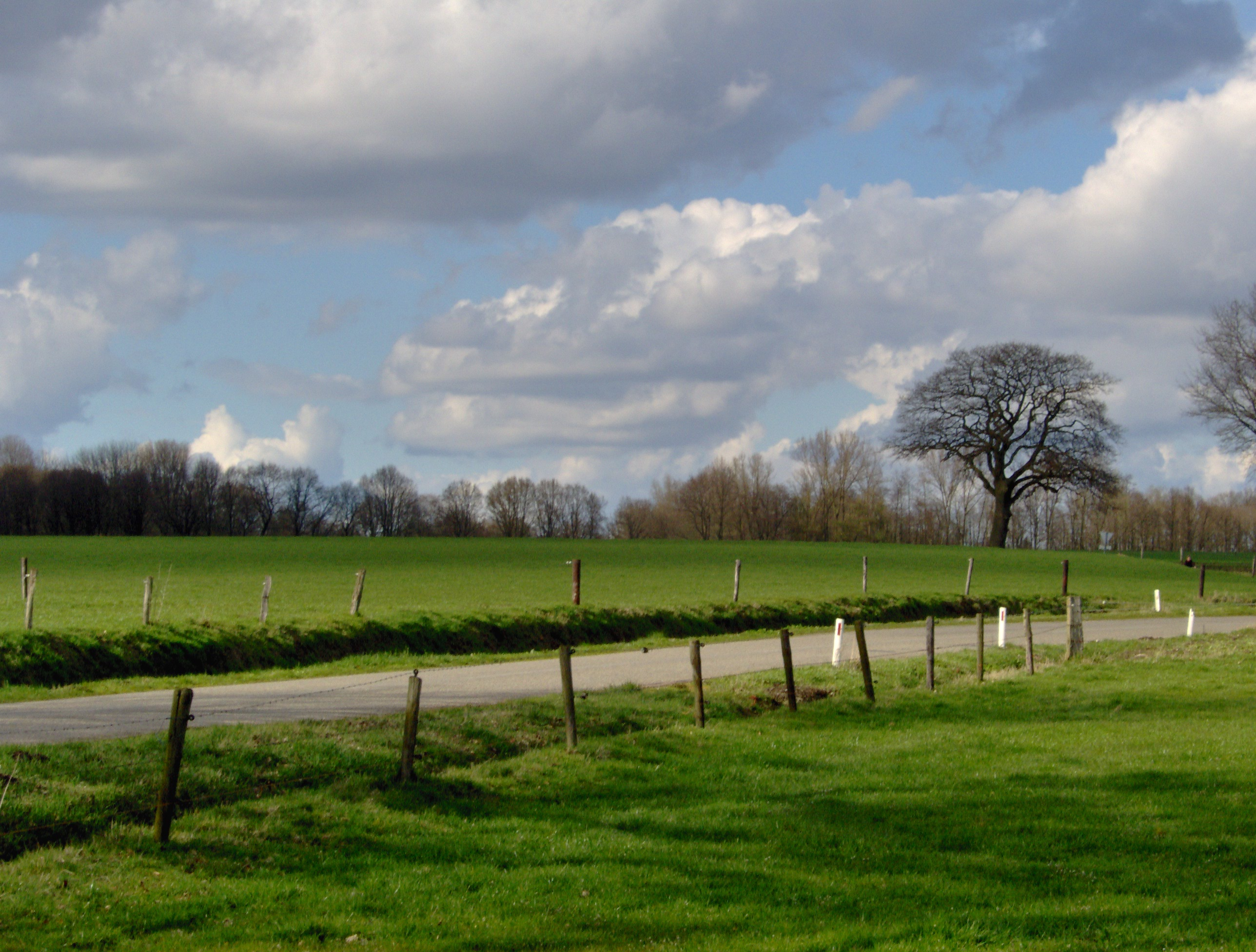
- Landscape near Groot Agelo

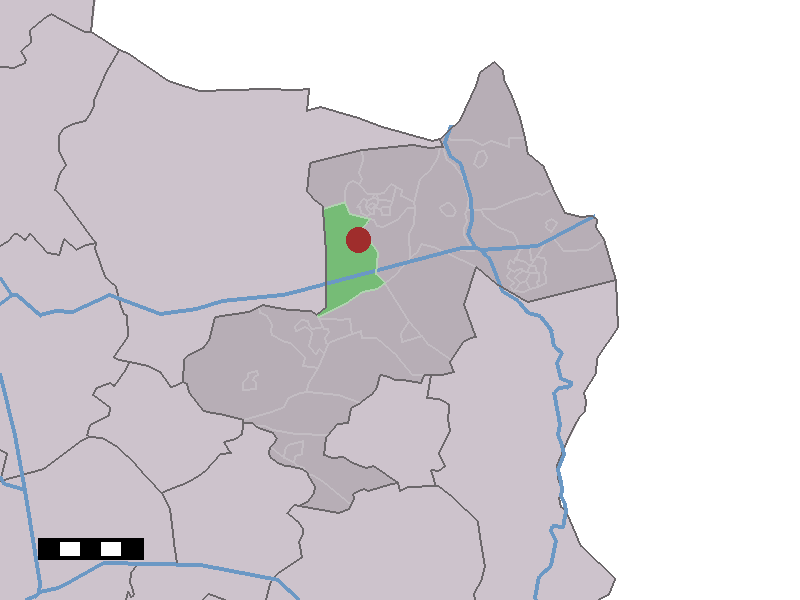
- The village (dark red) and the statistical district (light green) of Groot Agelo in the municipality of Dinkelland.

- Location in the Netherlands Groot Agelo (Netherlands)
- Coordinates: 52°23′33″N 6°53′10″E
- Country: Netherlands
- Province: Overijssel
- Municipality: Dinkelland

Area
  - Total: 10.24 km^{2} (3.95 sq mi)
- Elevation: 21 m (69 ft)

Population (2021)
  - Total: 375
  - Density: 36.6/km^{2} (94.8/sq mi)
- Time zone: UTC+1 (CET)
  - Summer (DST): UTC+2 (CEST)
- Postal code: 7636
- Dialing code: 0541

Groot Agelo is a hamlet in the Dutch province of Overijssel. It is a part of the municipality of Dinkelland, and lies about 9 km north of Oldenzaal.

It was first mentioned in 1252 as "Wicherus et Ludolfus filius suus de Agelo". The etymology is unclear. It is called Groot (Big) to distinguish from Klein Agelo (Little). Since 2009, both hamlets are listed under Agelo.

It has an elementary school named 'n Boaken. The people of Klein Agelo and Groot Agelo, places called together as just 'Agelo', go to church in Ootmarsum.

In this neighbourhood some fine examples of timber-framed cottages and barns can be found, displaying the Low German house style which is very common in the east of Twente.

== Gallery ==
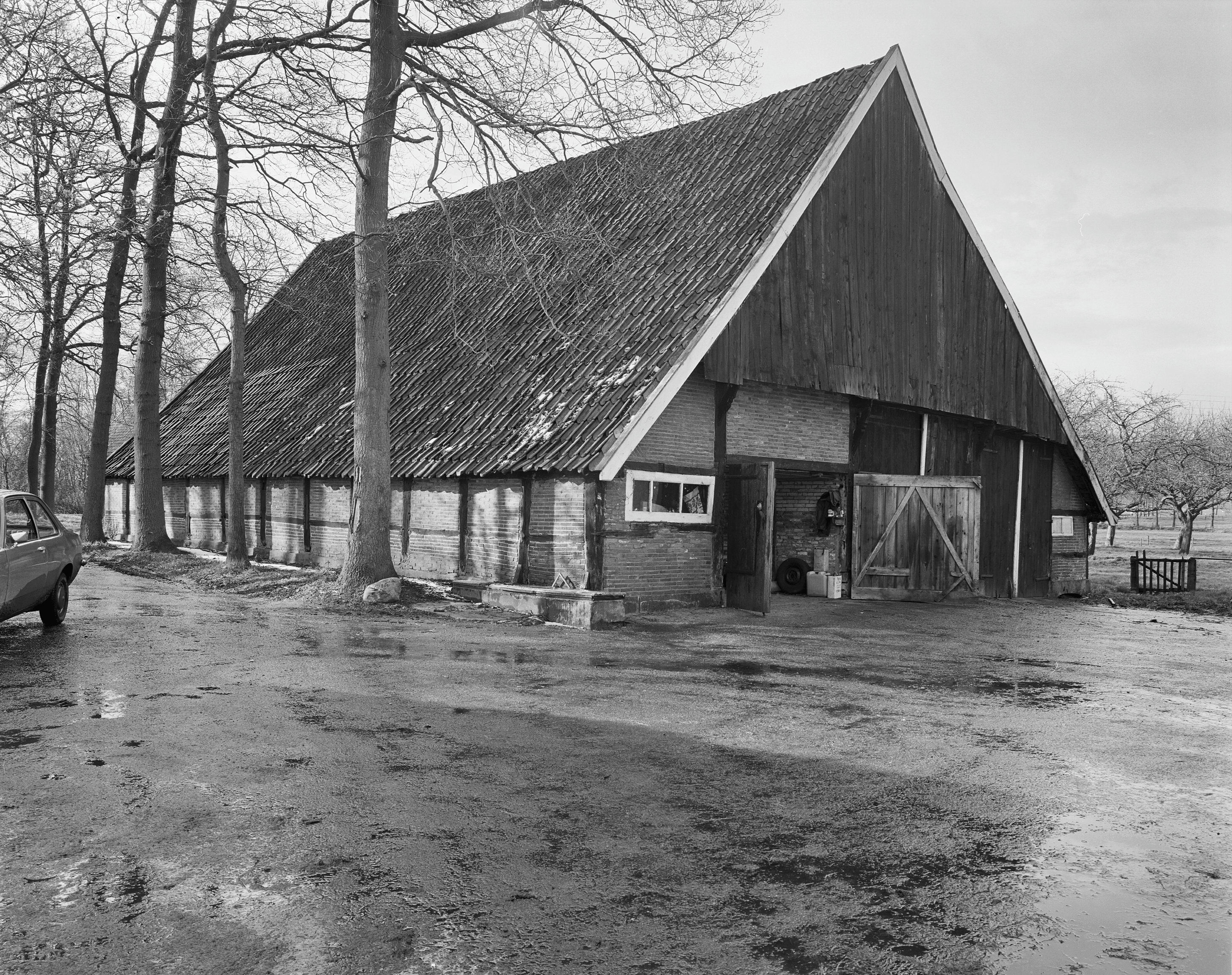
Timber framed barn

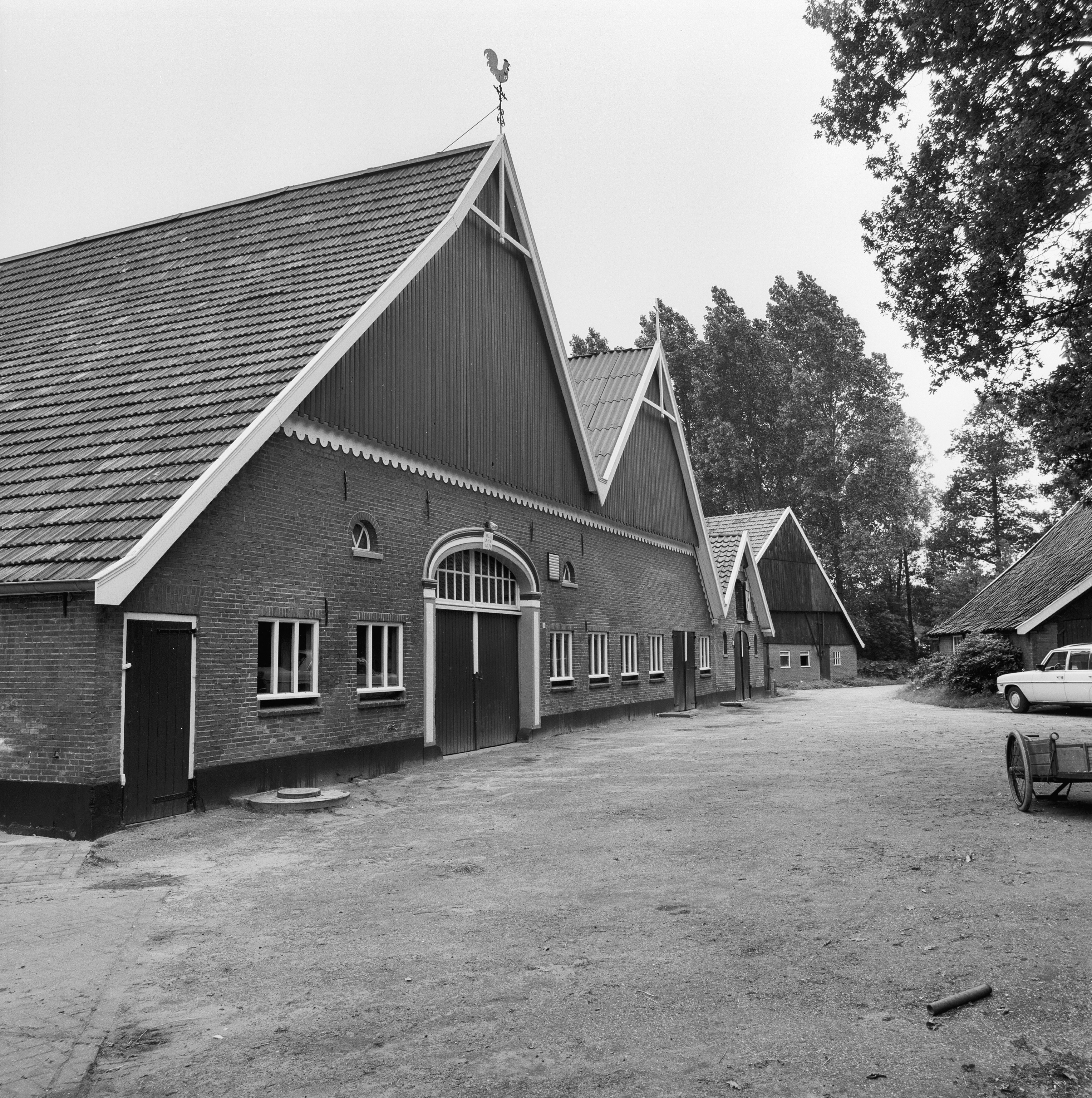
Old style farm

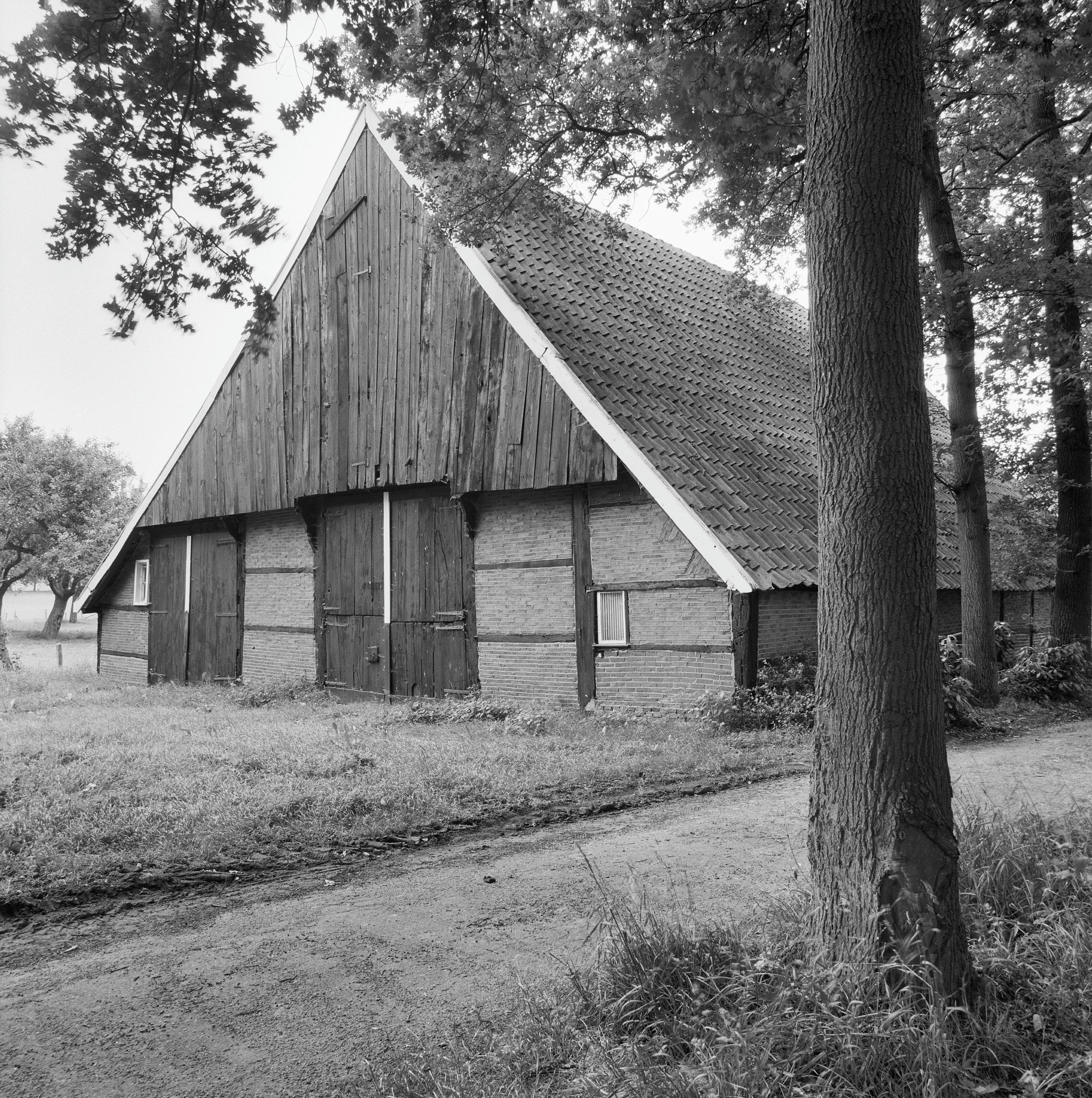
Old style barn
