= Heusden, Asten =

Heusden
- Village
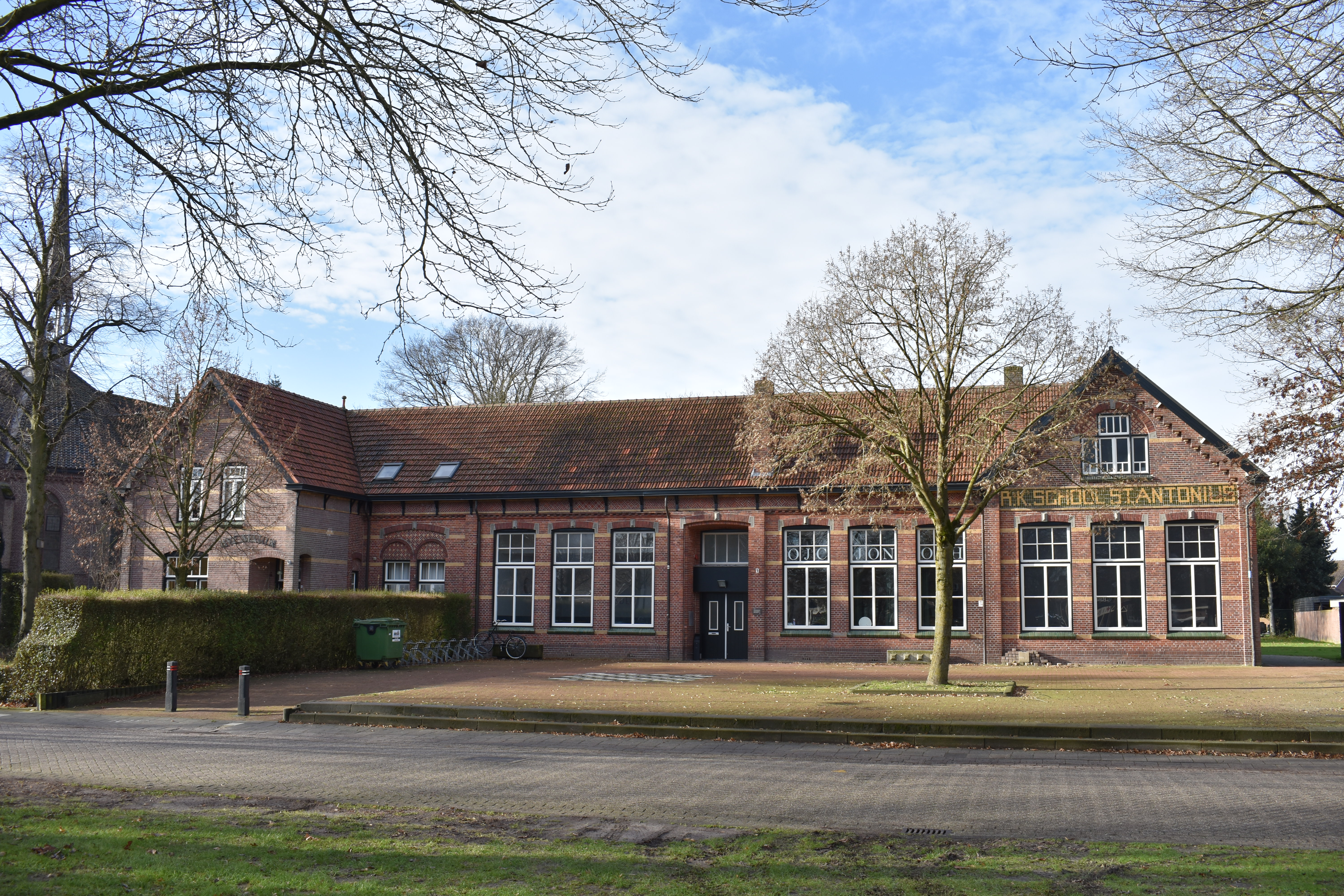
- Former school building in Heusden

- Flag

- Location in the province of North Brabant in the Netherlands Heusden (Netherlands)
- Coordinates: 51°23′2″N 5°45′50″E
- Country: Netherlands
- Province: North Brabant
- Municipality: Asten

Area
  - Total: 26.26 km^{2} (10.14 sq mi)
- Elevation: 6 m (20 ft)

Population (2021)
  - Total: 2,490
  - Density: 94.8/km^{2} (246/sq mi)
- Time zone: UTC+1 (CET)
  - Summer (DST): UTC+2 (CEST)
- Postal code: 5725
- Dialing code: 073

Heusden also known as Asten-Heusden (or Heuze among locals) is a small village in North Brabant in the Netherlands. It is in the so-called Peel region.

It was first mentioned in 1794 as Heusden. The etymology is unclear.

Heusden has a small village square with a few bars, a church, a grocery store, and a youth center. The village is only a couple kilometres from Asten which is much larger and the centre of activity for most residents of Heusden. Heusden also has the romantic remains of an old castle that dates from the fifteenth century. Attached to the ruins, a seventeenth-century v-shape farmstead is still in place.

== Gallery ==
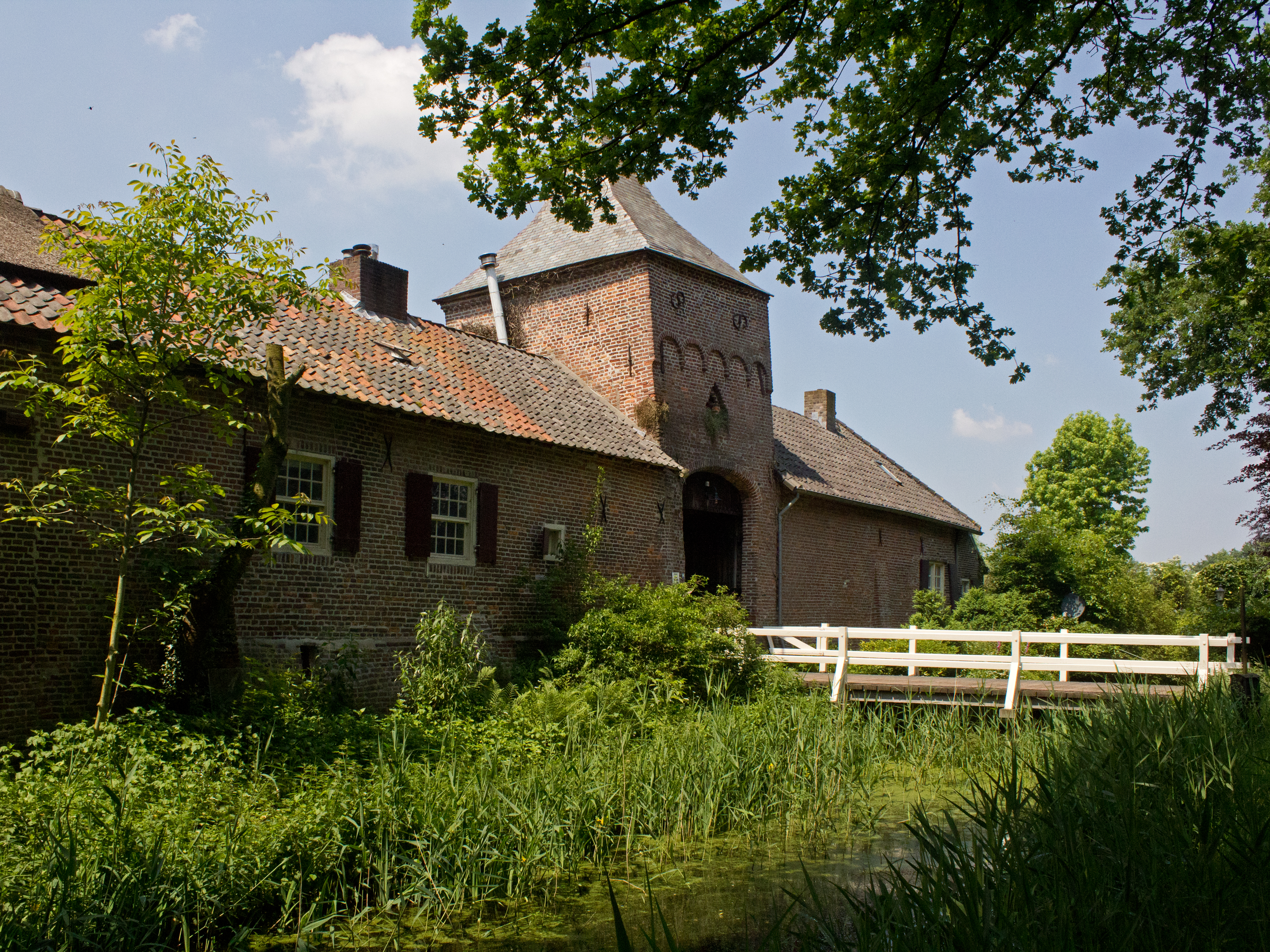
Outer bailey of Castle Asten

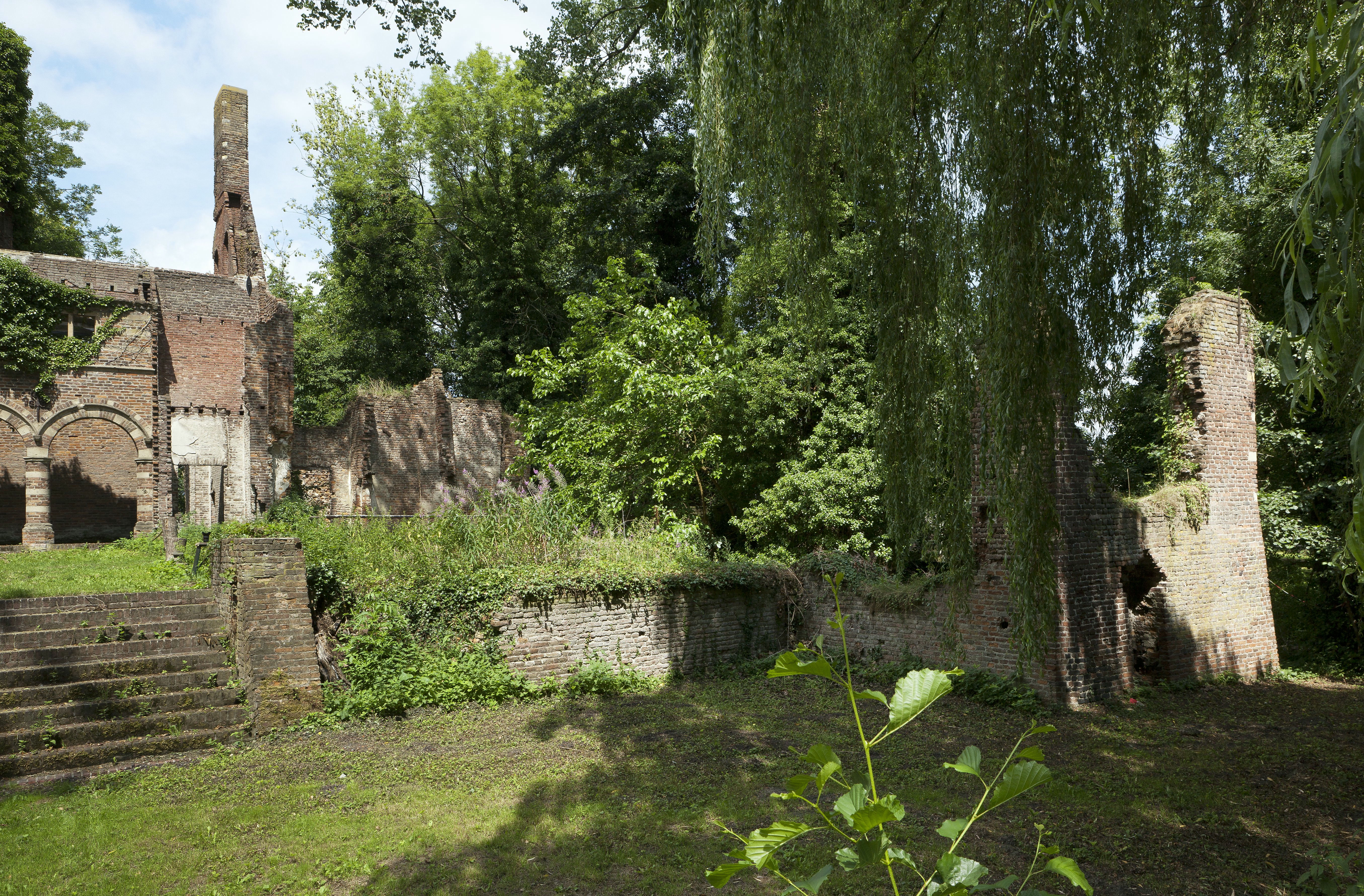
Ruins of the castle
