= Foreign policy of Vladimir Putin =

Foreign relations of Russia since 2012

The foreign policy of Vladimir Putin concerns the policies of the Russian president Vladimir Putin with respect to other nations. He has held the office of the President previously from 2000 to 2008, and reassumed power again in 2012 and has been President since.

As of late 2013, Russia–United States relations were at a low point. The United States canceled a summit for the first time since 1960, after Putin gave asylum to Edward Snowden. Washington regarded Russia as obstructionist regarding Syria, Iran, Cuba and Venezuela. In turn, those nations look to Russia for support against the United States. Some nations of Western Europe purchase Russian gas, but are concerned about interference in the affairs of Eastern Europe. The expansion of NATO and the European Union into Eastern Europe much conflicts with Russian interests, which has pushed them to become more aggressive to attempt to influence and "Russianise" Eastern Europe, the Caucasus, and Central Asia.

Beyond Russia's neighbours in foreign relations is India, who at one point, was a close ally of Russia and the Soviet Union, is now drifting towards the United States with stronger nuclear and commercial ties. Japan and Russia remain at odds over the ownership of the Kuril Islands; this dispute has hindered much cooperation for numerous decades, originating back from the Soviet Union's annexation of them at the end of World War Two. China has recently moved to become a close ally of Russia despite its falling out with the former Soviet Union.

In 2014, with NATO's decision to suspend practical co-operation with Russia and all major Western countries' decision to impose a host of sanctions against Russia, in response to the Russian military intervention in Ukraine, Russia's relationship with the West came to be characterised as assuming an adversarial nature, or the advent of Cold War II.

== Relations with NATO and its member nations ==
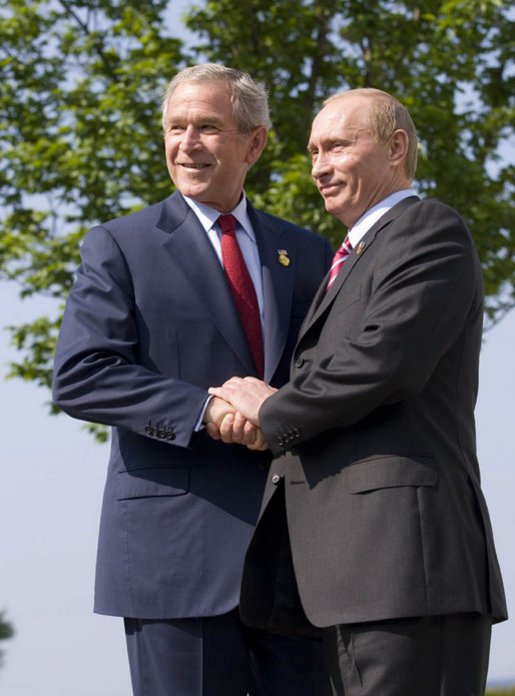
U.S. President George W. Bush and Putin at the 33rd G8 summit, June 2007

After the 11 September attacks, Putin supported the U.S. in the war on terror, thus creating an opportunity for deepening the relationship with the leading Western and NATO power. On 13 December 2001, Bush gave Russia notice of the United States' unilateral withdrawal from the Anti-Ballistic Missile Treaty. From Russia's point of view, the US withdrawal from the agreement, which ensured strategic parity between the parties, destroyed hopes for a new partnership. Russia opposed the expansion of NATO which happened at the 2002 Prague summit.

Since 2003, when Russia did not support the Iraq War and when Putin became ever more distant from the West in his internal and external policies, the relations remained strained. In an interview with Michael Stürmer, Putin was quoted saying that there were three questions which most concerned Russia and Eastern Europe; namely the status of Kosovo, the Treaty on Conventional Armed Forces in Europe, and American plans to build missile defence sites in Poland and the Czech Republic, and suggested that all three were some way linked. In Putin's view, concessions on one of these questions on the Western side might be met with concessions from Russia on another.

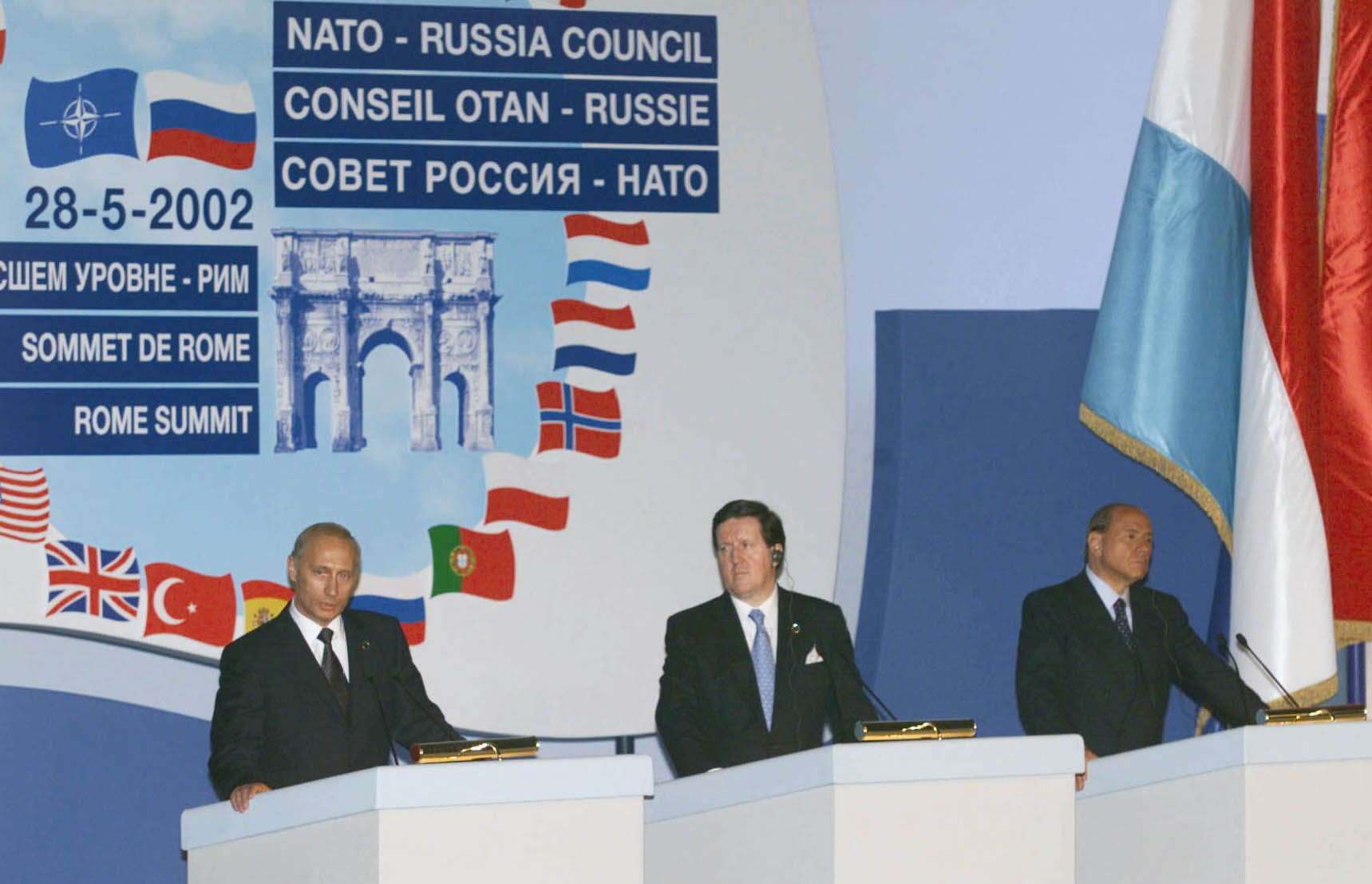
Putin, Berlusconi and NATO Secretary General George Robertson at the Russia-NATO Summit in Rome, Italy on 28 May 2002

In February 2007, at the annual Munich Conference on Security Policy, Putin openly criticised what he called the United States' monopolistic dominance in global relations, and "almost uncontained hyper use of force in international relations". In this speech, which became known as Munich Speech, Putin called for a "fair and democratic world order that would ensure security and prosperity not only for a select few, but for all". His remarks however were met with criticism by some delegates such as former NATO secretary Jaap de Hoop Scheffer who called his speech, "disappointing and not helpful."

The months following Putin's Munich speech were marked by tension and a surge in rhetoric on both sides of the Atlantic. Both Russian and American officials, however, denied the idea of a new Cold War. Then US Secretary of Defense Robert Gates said on the Munich Conference: "We all face many common problems and challenges that must be addressed in partnership with other countries, including Russia. ... One Cold War was quite enough." Vladimir Putin said prior to 33rd G8 Summit, on 4 June 2007: "we do not want confrontation; we want to engage in dialogue. However, we want a dialogue that acknowledges the equality of both parties' interests."

In June 2007, when answering a question about whether Russian nuclear forces might be focused on European targets in case "the United States continued building a strategic shield in Poland and the Czech Republic", Putin admitted: "if part of the United States' nuclear capability is situated in Europe and that our military experts consider that they represent a potential threat, then we will have to take appropriate retaliatory steps. What steps? Of course we must have new targets in Europe."

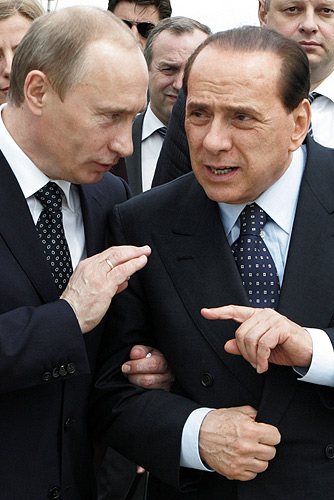
Putin with Italian Prime Minister Silvio Berlusconi, in 2008

Putin continued his public opposition of a U.S. missile shield in Europe, and presented President George W. Bush with a counterproposal on 7 June 2007 of sharing the use of the Soviet-era radar system in Azerbaijan rather than building a new system in the Czech Republic. Putin expressed readiness to modernise the Gabala Radar Station, which has been in operation since 1986. Putin proposed it would not be necessary to place interceptor missiles in Poland then, but interceptors could be placed in Iraq or NATO member Turkey. Putin suggested also equal involvement of interested European countries in the project.

In his annual address to the Federal Assembly on 26 April 2007, Putin announced plans to declare a moratorium on the observance of the CFE Treaty by Russia until all NATO members ratified it and started observing its provisions, as Russia had been doing on a unilateral basis. Putin argues that as new NATO members have not even signed the treaty so far, an imbalance in the presence of NATO and Russian armed forces in Europe creates a real threat and an unpredictable situation for Russia. NATO members said they would refuse to ratify the treaty until Russia complied with its 1999 commitments made in Istanbul whereby Russia should remove troops and military equipment from Moldova and Georgia. Russian Foreign Minister Sergey Lavrov was quoted as saying in response that "Russia has long since fulfilled all its Istanbul obligations relevant to CFE".

Russia suspended its participation in the CFE as of midnight Moscow time on 11 December 2007. On 12 December 2007, the United States officially said it "deeply regretted the Russian Federation's decision to 'suspend' implementation of its obligations under the Treaty on Conventional Armed Forces in Europe (CFE)." State Department spokesman Sean McCormack, in a written statement, added that "Russia's conventional forces are the largest on the European continent, and its unilateral action damages this successful arms control regime." NATO's primary concern arising from Russia's suspension is that Moscow could now accelerate its military presence in the Northern Caucasus.

Putin strongly opposed the secession of Kosovo from Serbia. He called any support for this act "immoral" and "illegal". He described the 2008 Kosovo declaration of independence a "terrible precedent" that will come back to hit the West "in the face". He stated that the Kosovo precedent will de facto destroy the whole system of international relations, developed over centuries.

Putin's relations with former British Prime Minister Tony Blair, former German Chancellor Gerhard Schröder, former French Presidents Jacques Chirac, and Nicolas Sarkozy and Italian Prime Minister Silvio Berlusconi were reported to be personally friendly. Putin's "cooler" and "more business-like" relationship with Germany's subsequent Chancellor, Angela Merkel is often attributed to Merkel's upbringing in the former DDR, where Putin was stationed when he was a KGB agent.

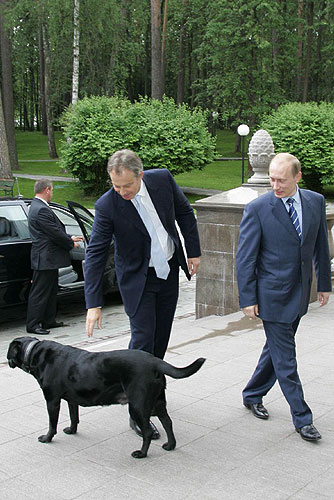
Putin, Koni and British Prime Minister Tony Blair in 2005

By mid-2000s (decade), the relations between Russia and the United Kingdom deteriorated when the United Kingdom granted political asylum to, oligarch Boris Berezovsky, in 2003. Berezovsky, located in London, often criticised Putin. The United Kingdom also granted asylum to the Chechen rebel leader Akhmed Zakayev and other notable persons who had fled Russia.

In 2006, President Putin introduced a law which restricted non-governmental organisations (NGOs) from getting funding from foreign governments. This resulted in many NGOs closing.

The end of 2006 brought strained relations between Russia and Britain in the wake of the death of Alexander Litvinenko in London by poisoning with polonium-210. On 20 July 2007, the Gordon Brown government expelled "four Russian envoys over Putin's refusal to extradite ex-KGB agent Andrei Lugovoi, wanted in the UK for the murder of fellow former spy Alexander Litvinenko in London." The Russian government, among other things, said it would suspend issuing visas to UK officials and froze cooperation on counterterrorism in response to Britain suspending contacts with their Federal Security Service.

Alexander Shokhin, president of the Russian Union of Industrialists and Entrepreneurs warned that British investors in Russia will "face greater scrutiny from tax and regulatory authorities. [And] They could also lose out in government tenders". On 11 December 2007, Russia ordered the British Council to halt work at its regional offices in what was seen as the latest round of a dispute over the murder of Alexander Litvinenko; Britain said Russia's move was illegal.

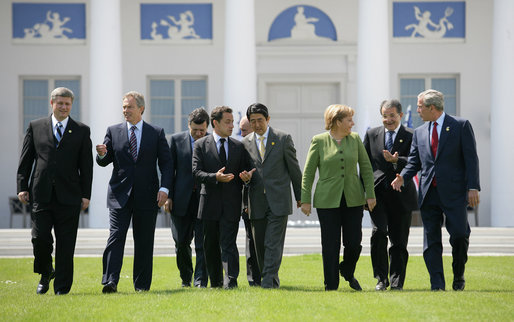
Leaders of the 33rd G8 summit in Heiligendamm, Germany, 2007

On 1 April 2014, NATO decided to suspend practical co-operation with Russia, in response to the Annexation of Crimea by the Russian Federation.

Putin has denounced the idea of "American exceptionalism". Putin has brought up police behavior in Ferguson in response to criticisms of democracy in Russia.

A report released in November 2014 highlighted the fact that close military encounters between Russia and the West (mainly NATO countries) had jumped to Cold War levels, with 40 dangerous or sensitive incidents recorded in the eight months alone, including a near-collision between a Russian reconnaissance plane and a Scandinavian Airlines passenger plane taking off from Denmark in March 2014 with 132 passengers on board. The 2014 unprecedented increase in Russian air force and naval activity in the Baltic region prompted NATO to step up its longstanding rotation of military jets in Lithuania.

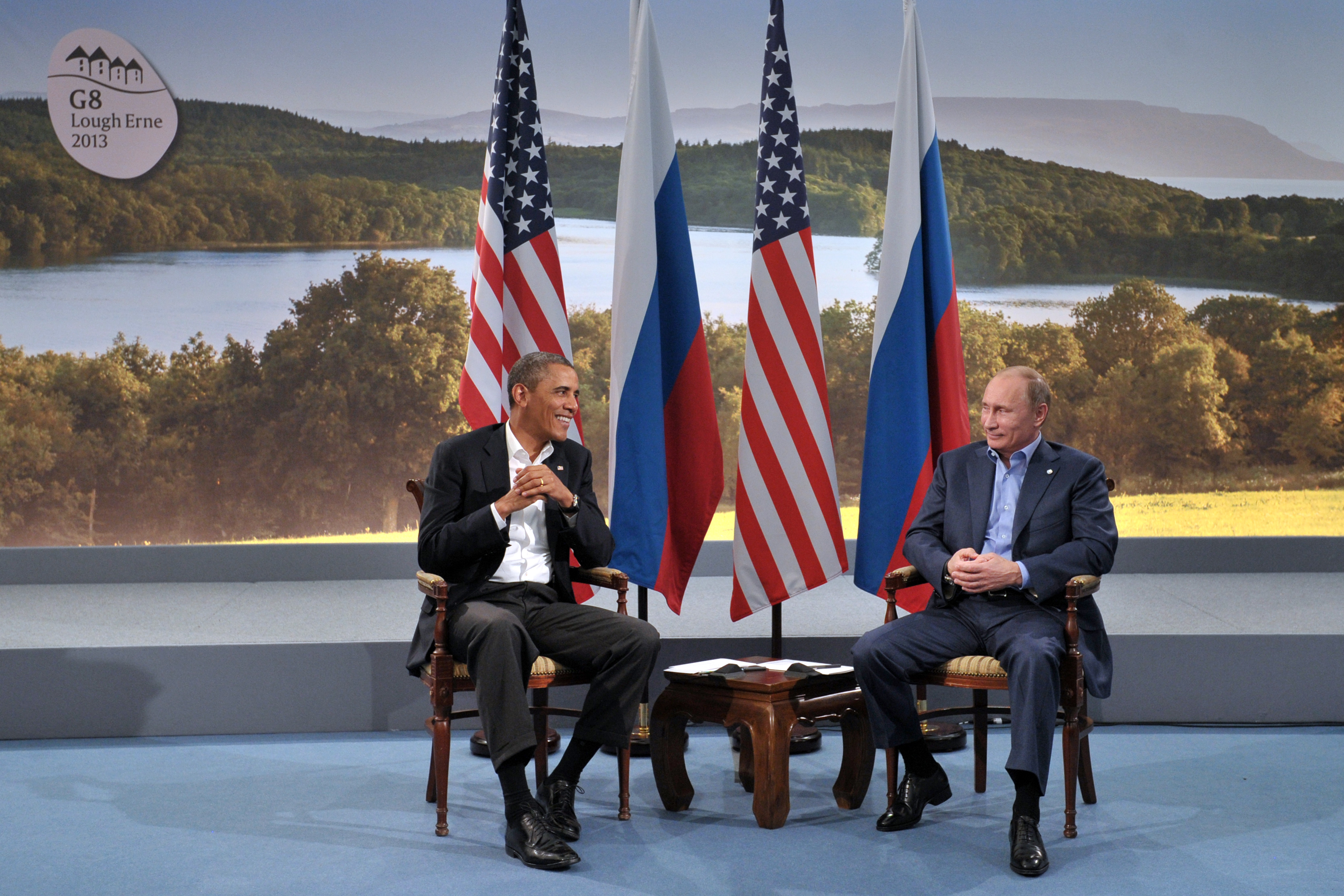
Putin and US President Barack Obama at the 39th G8 summit in Northern Ireland on 17 June 2013

Similar Russian Air Force activity in the Asia-Pacific region, relying on the resumed use of the previously abandoned Soviet military base at Cam Ranh Bay, Vietnam, in 2014, was officially acknowledged by Russia in January 2015. In March 2015, Russia's defense minister Sergey Shoygu said that Russia's strategic bombers would continue patrolling various parts of the world and expand into other regions.

In July 2014, the U.S. formally accused Russia of having violated the 1987 Intermediate-Range Nuclear Forces (INF) Treaty by testing a prohibited medium-range ground-launched cruise missile (presumably R-500, a modification of Iskander) and threatened to retaliate accordingly. In early June 2015, the U.S. State Department reported that Russia had failed to correct the violation of the I.N.F. Treaty; the U.S. government was said to have made no discernible headway in making Russia so much as acknowledge the compliance problem.

The US government's October 2014 report claimed that Russia had 1,643 nuclear warheads ready to launch (an increase from 1,537 in 2011) – one more than the US, thus overtaking the US for the first time since 2000; both countries' deployed capacity being in violation of the 2010 New START treaty that sets a cap of 1,550 nuclear warheads. Likewise, even before 2014, the US had set about implementing a large-scale program, worth up to a trillion dollars, aimed at overall revitalization of its atomic energy industry, which includes plans for a new generation of weapon carriers and construction of such sites as the Chemistry and Metallurgy Research Replacement Facility in Los Alamos, New Mexico and the National Security Campus in south Kansas City.

At the end of 2014, Putin approved a revised national military doctrine, which listed NATO's military buildup near the Russian borders as the top military threat.

In late June 2015, while on a trip to Estonia, US Defence Secretary Ashton Carter said the U.S. would deploy heavy weapons, including tanks, armoured vehicles and artillery, in Bulgaria, Estonia, Latvia, Lithuania, Poland, and Romania. The move was interpreted by Western commentators as marking the beginning of a reorientation of NATO's strategy. It was called by a senior Russian Defence Ministry official ″the most aggressive act by Washington since the Cold War″ and criticised by the Russian Foreign Ministry as "inadequate in military terms" and "an obvious return by the United States and its allies to the schemes of 'the Cold War'".

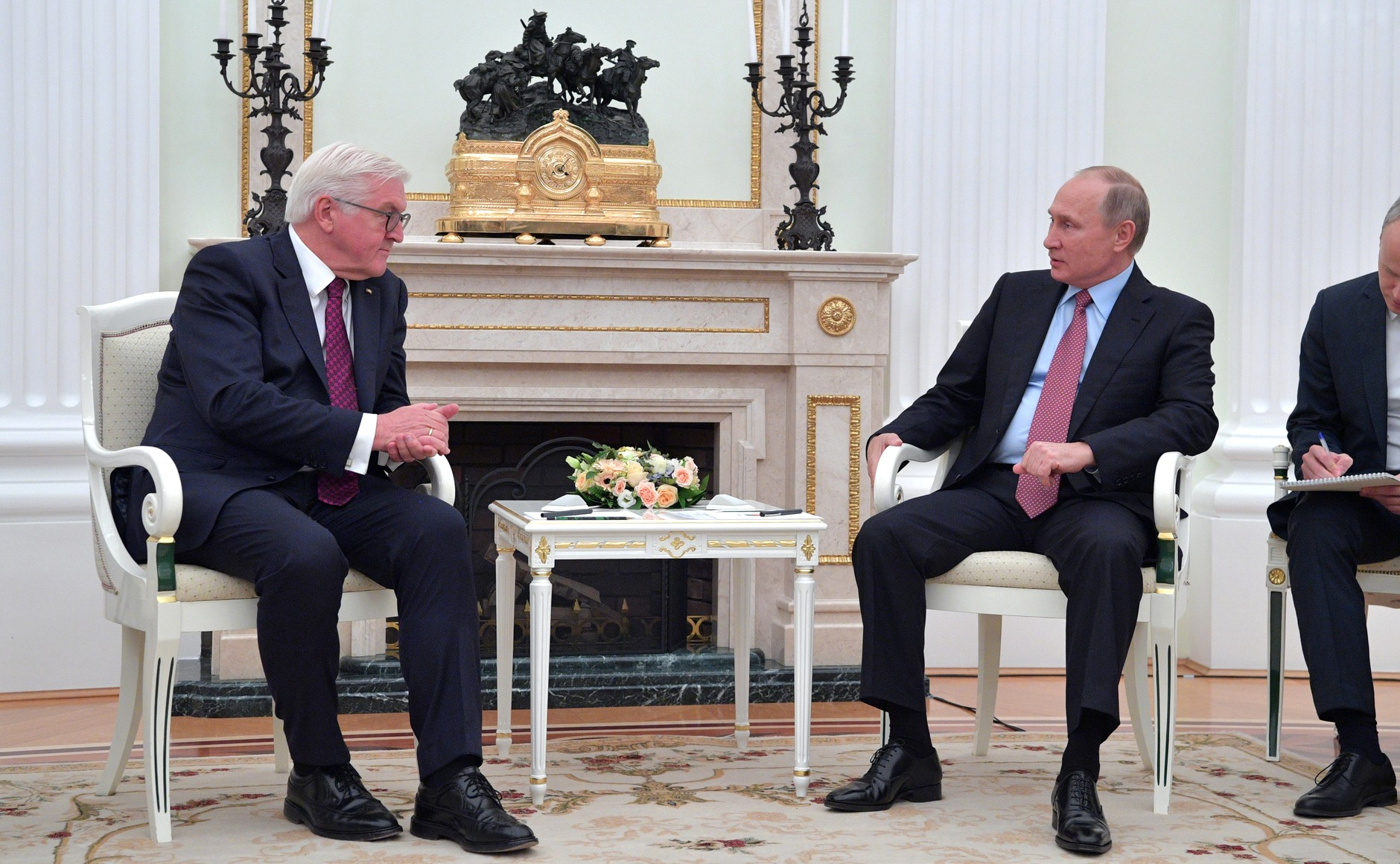
Meeting with German President Frank-Walter Steinmeier in Moscow, 2017

On its part, the U.S. expressed concern over Putin's announcement of plans to add over 40 new ballistic missiles to Russia's nuclear weapons arsenal in 2015. American observers and analysts, such as Steven Pifer, noting that the U.S. had no reason for alarm about the new missiles, provided that Russia remained within the limits of the 2010 New Strategic Arms Reduction Treaty (New START), viewed the ratcheting-up of nuclear saber-rattling by Russia's leadership as mainly bluff and bluster designed to conceal Russia's weaknesses; however, Pifer suggested that the most alarming motivation behind this rhetoric could be Putin seeing nuclear weapons not merely as tools of deterrence, but as tools of coercion.

Meanwhile, at the end of June 2015, it was reported that the production schedule for a new Russian MIRV-equipped, super-heavy thermonuclear intercontinental ballistic missile Sarmat, intended to replace the obsolete Soviet-era SS-18 Satan missiles, was slipping. Also noted by commentators were the inevitable financial and technological constraints that would hamper any real arms race with the West, if such course were to be embarked on by Russia.

On 25 December 2022, in an interview for the national television he accused the West of trying to tear Russia apart and openly declared, that his goal—"to unite the Russian people."

On 28 July 2024, Russian President Vladimir Putin threatens to deploy long-range missiles that could hit all of Europe, after the United States announced its intention to deploy long-range missiles in Germany from 2026.

== Tensions in other European countries and relations with the former Soviet bloc ==
The Eastern Bloc during the Cold War

The Russian leadership under Putin sees the fracturing of the political unity within the EU and especially the political unity between the EU and the US as among its main strategic goals. Russia seeks to gain dominant influence in former Eastern Bloc states that are culturally and historically close to it, corrode and undermine Western institutions and values, manipulate public opinion and policy-making throughout Europe.

As the West supported Kosovo's independence, Russia later used the "Kosovo precedent" as justification for its annexation of Crimea and its support of breakaway states in Georgia and Moldova.

In November 2014, the German government publicly voiced its concern about what it saw as efforts by Putin to spread Russia's 'sphere of influence' beyond former Soviet states in the Balkans in countries such as Serbia, Macedonia, Albania and Bosnia, which could impede those countries' progress towards membership in the European Union.

A series of Europe's far-right and hard Eurosceptic political parties such as Bulgaria's Ataka, the Alternative for Germany, France's National Front, the Freedom Party of Austria, Italy's Northern League, the Independent Greeks and Hungary's Jobbik, have been reported to be courted or even funded by Russia. Russia's ideological approach to this type of activity is opportunistic: it supports both far-left and far-right groups, the aim being to exacerbate divides in Western states and destabilise the EU through fringe political parties gaining more clout. The success of these parties in the May 2014 European elections caused concern that a coherent pro-Russian block was forming in the European Parliament.

In early January 2015, public protests in Hungary broke out against Hungarian Prime Minister Viktor Orbán's perceived move towards Russia. Previously, his government had negotiated secret loans from the Russians, awarded a major nuclear power contract to Rosatom, and made the National Assembly give a green light to Russia's gas pipeline project in contravention to blocking orders from Brussels.

In early April 2015, the Polish border guard sources were cited as saying that Poland was preparing to build observation towers along its border with the Russian exclave of Kaliningrad; the move was linked by the mass media to prior official vaguely-worded confirmation, in December 2013, of Russia's putative deployment of its advanced modification of nuclear-capable Iskander theatre ballistic missiles in the exclave's territory, as well as more recent, March 2015, unofficial reports of the same nature.

The prime minister of Montenegro Milo Đukanović went on record in October 2015 to claim that Russia was sponsoring the anti-government and anti-NATO protests in Podgorica.

== Relations with South and East Asia ==
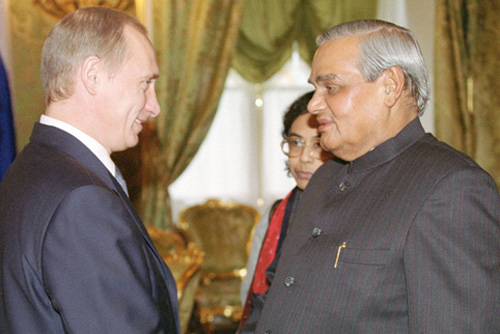
India's Former Prime Minister Atal Bihari Vajpayee with Russia's president Vladimir Putin in November 2001

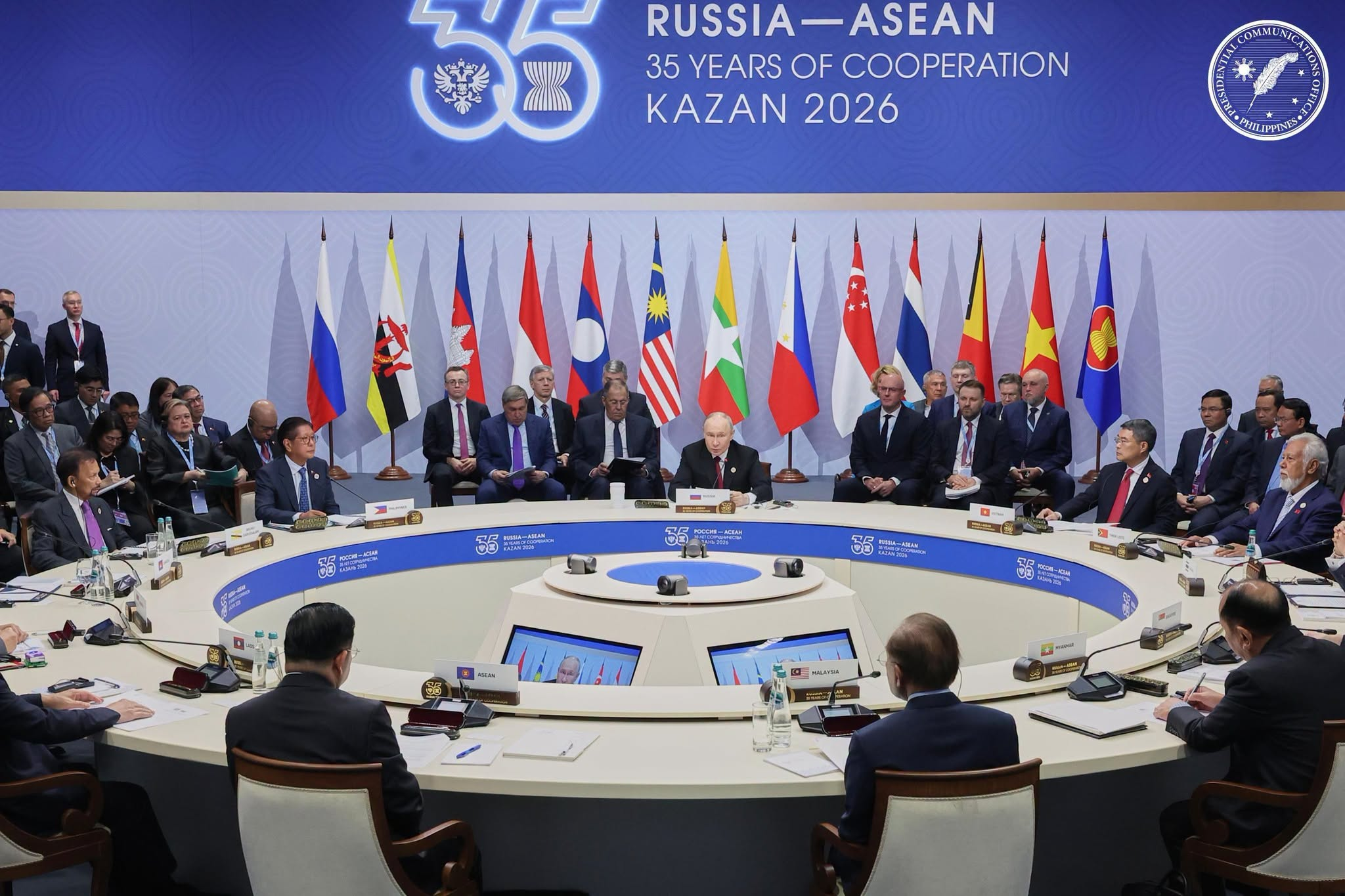
Putin and ASEAN leaders during the ASEAN–Russia Commemorative Summit in Kazan, Russia, 18 June 2026

During his first and second term in office, bilateral trade turnover between India and Russia was modest and stood at US$3 billion, of which Indian exports to Russia were valued at US$908 million. The major Indian exports to Russia are pharmaceuticals; tea, coffee and spices; apparel and clothing; edible preparations; and engineering goods. Main Indian imports from Russia are iron and steel; fertilisers; non-ferrous metals; paper products; coal, coke & briquettes; cereals; and rubber. Indo-Russian trade is expected to reach US$10 billion by 2010. Putin wrote in an article in The Hindu, "The Declaration on Strategic Partnership between India and Russia signed in October 2000 became a truly historic step".

Prime Minister Manmohan Singh also agreed with his counterpart by stating in a speech given during President Putin's 2012 visit to India, "President Putin is a valued friend of India and the original architect of the India-Russia strategic partnership". Both countries closely collaborate on matters of shared national interest these include at the UN, BRICS, G20 and where India has observer status and has been asked by Russia to become a full member. Russia also strongly supports India receiving a permanent seat on the United Nations Security Council. In addition, Russia has vocally backed India joining the NSG and APEC. Moreover, it has also expressed interest in joining SAARC with observer status in which India is a founding member.

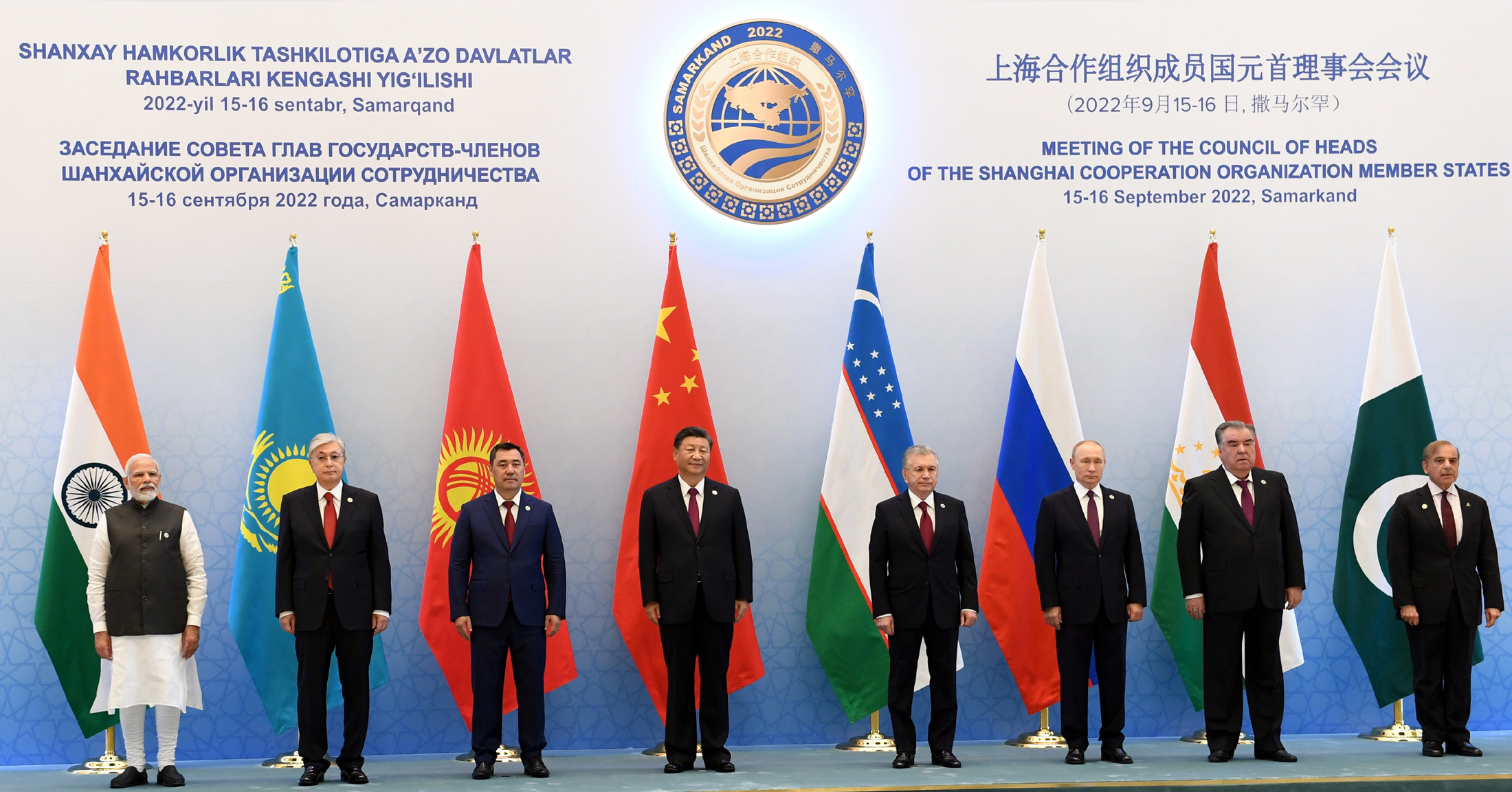
Putin with Chinese leader Xi Jinping, Indian Prime Minister Narendra Modi and other leaders at the Shanghai Cooperation Organisation summit on 16 September 2022

Russia currently is one of only two countries in the world (the other being Japan) that has a mechanism for annual ministerial-level defence reviews with India. The Indo-Russian Inter-Governmental Commission (IRIGC), which is one of the largest and comprehensive governmental mechanisms that India has had with any country internationally. Almost every department from the Government of India attends it.

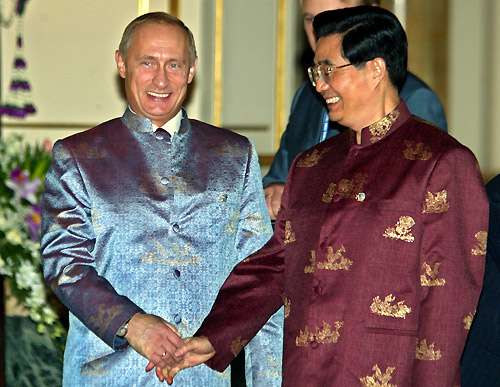
Vladimir Putin and Chinese leader Hu Jintao at the 2003 APEC Summit in Thailand

Putin's Russia maintains strong and positive relations with other BRIC countries. The country has sought to strengthen ties especially with the People's Republic of China by signing the Treaty of Friendship as well as building the Trans-Siberian oil pipeline geared toward growing Chinese energy needs. The mutual-security cooperation of the two countries and their central Asian neighbours is facilitated by the Shanghai Cooperation Organisation which was founded in 2001 in Shanghai by the leaders of China, Kazakhstan, Kyrgyzstan, Russia, Tajikistan, and Uzbekistan.

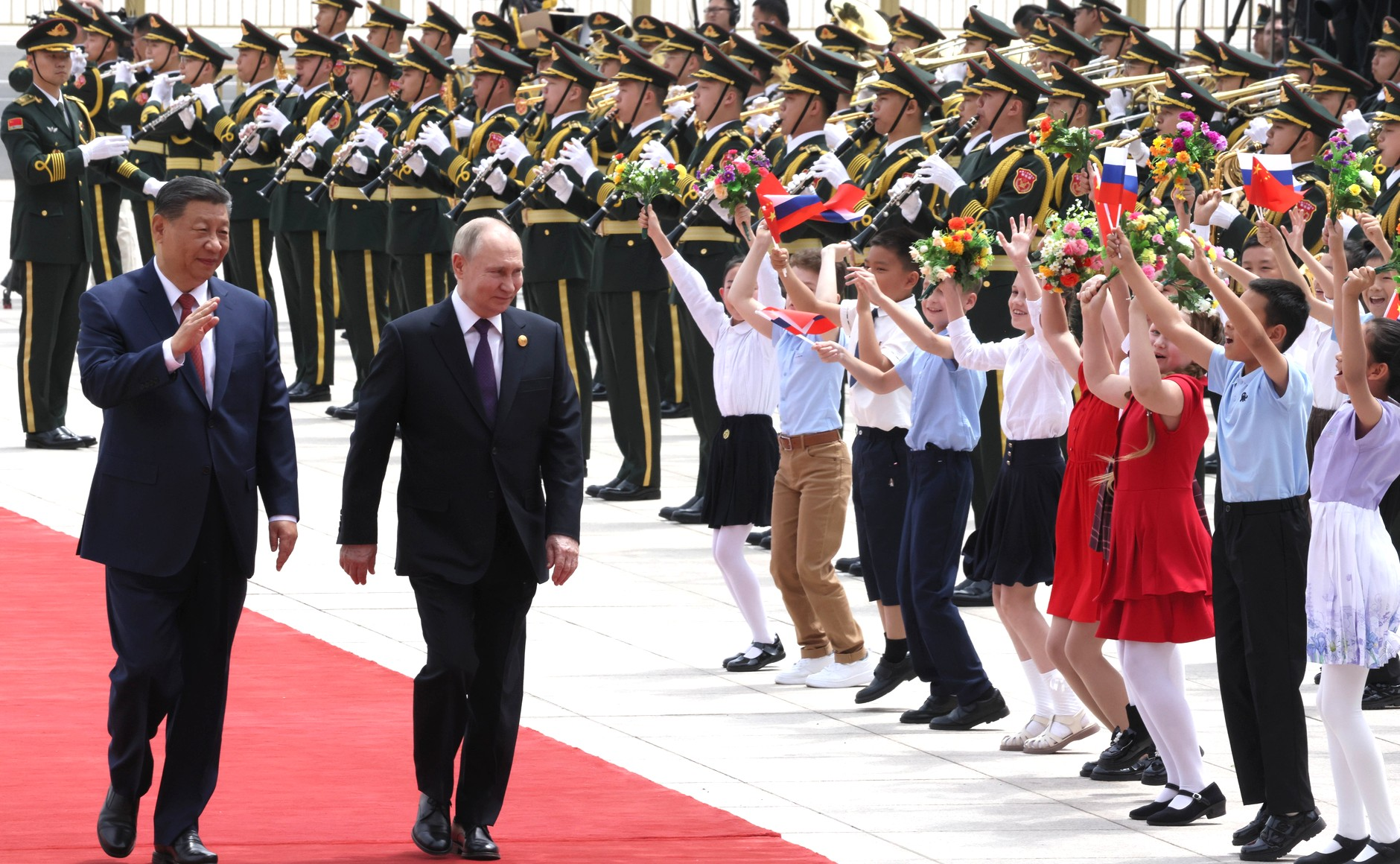
Chinese leader Xi Jinping welcomes Putin in Beijing during Putin's visit to China in May 2024

Following the Peace Mission 2007 military exercises jointly conducted by the Shanghai Cooperation Organisation (SCO) member states, Putin announced on 17 August 2007 the resumption on a permanent basis of long-distance patrol flights of Russian Air Force Tu-95 and Tu-160 strategic bombers that had been suspended since 1992. The announcement made during the SCO summit in the light of joint Russian-Chinese military exercises, first-ever in history to be held on Russian territory, made some believe that Putin is inclined to set up an anti-NATO bloc or the Asian version of OPEC.

When presented with the suggestion that "Western observers are already likening the SCO to a military organisation that would stand in opposition to NATO", Putin answered that "this kind of comparison is inappropriate in both form and substance". Russian Chief of the General Staff Yury Baluyevsky was quoted as saying that "there should be no talk of creating a military or political alliance or union of any kind, because this would contradict the founding principles of SCO".

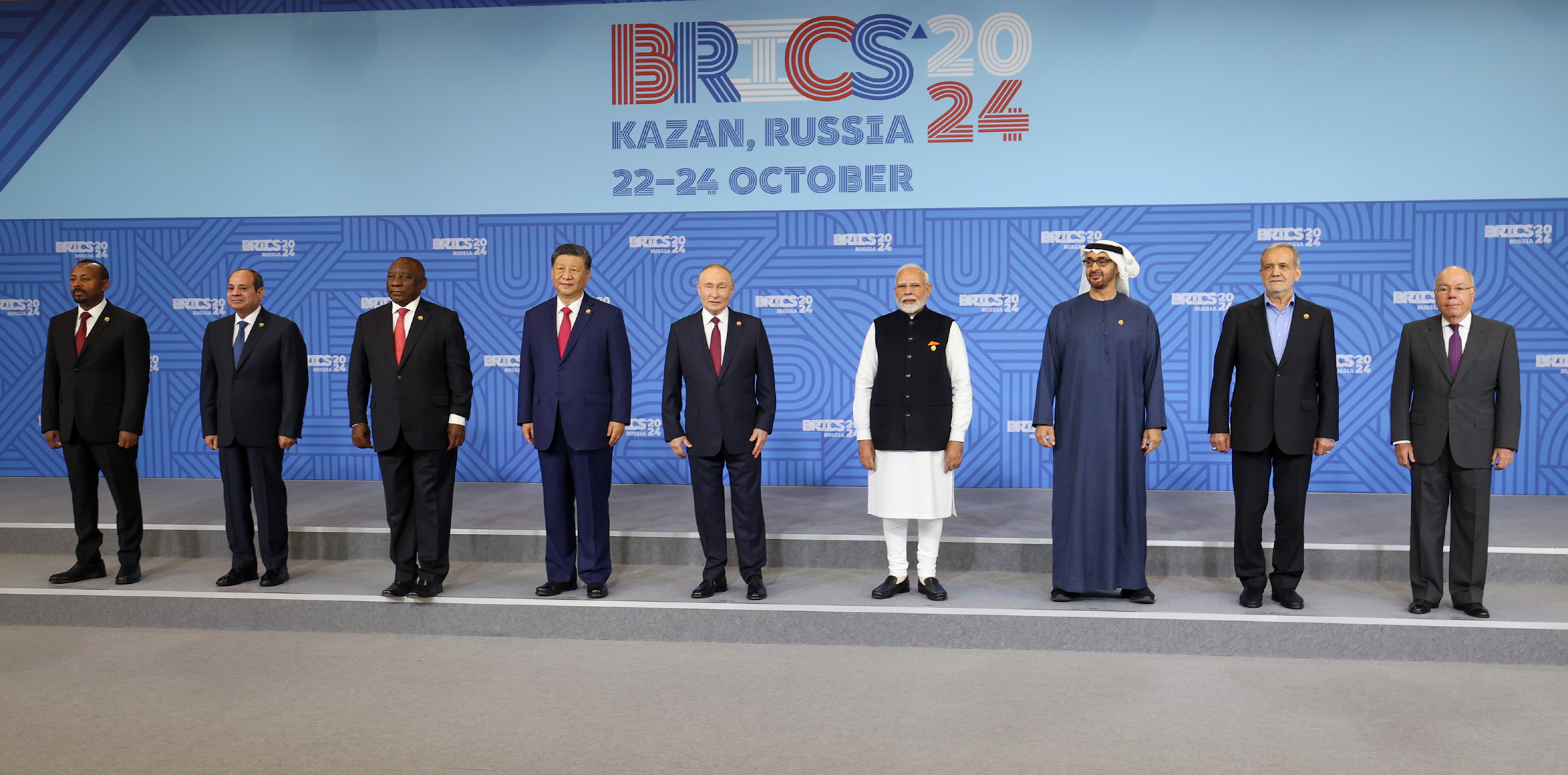
Putin with heads of delegations at the 16th BRICS summit in Kazan, Russia, 23 October 2024

The resumption of long-distance flights of Russia's strategic bombers was followed by the announcement by Russian Defense Minister Anatoliy Serdyukov during his meeting with Putin on 5 December 2007, that 11 ships, including the aircraft carrier Kuznetsov, would take part in the first major Russian Navy sortie into the Mediterranean since Soviet times. The sortie was to be backed up by 47 aircraft, including strategic bombers. According to Serdyukov, this was an effort to resume regular Russian naval patrols on the world's oceans, the view that was also supported by Russian media. The military analyst from Novaya Gazeta Pavel Felgenhauer said that the accident-prone Kuznetsov was scarcely seaworthy and was more of a menace to her crew than any putative enemy.

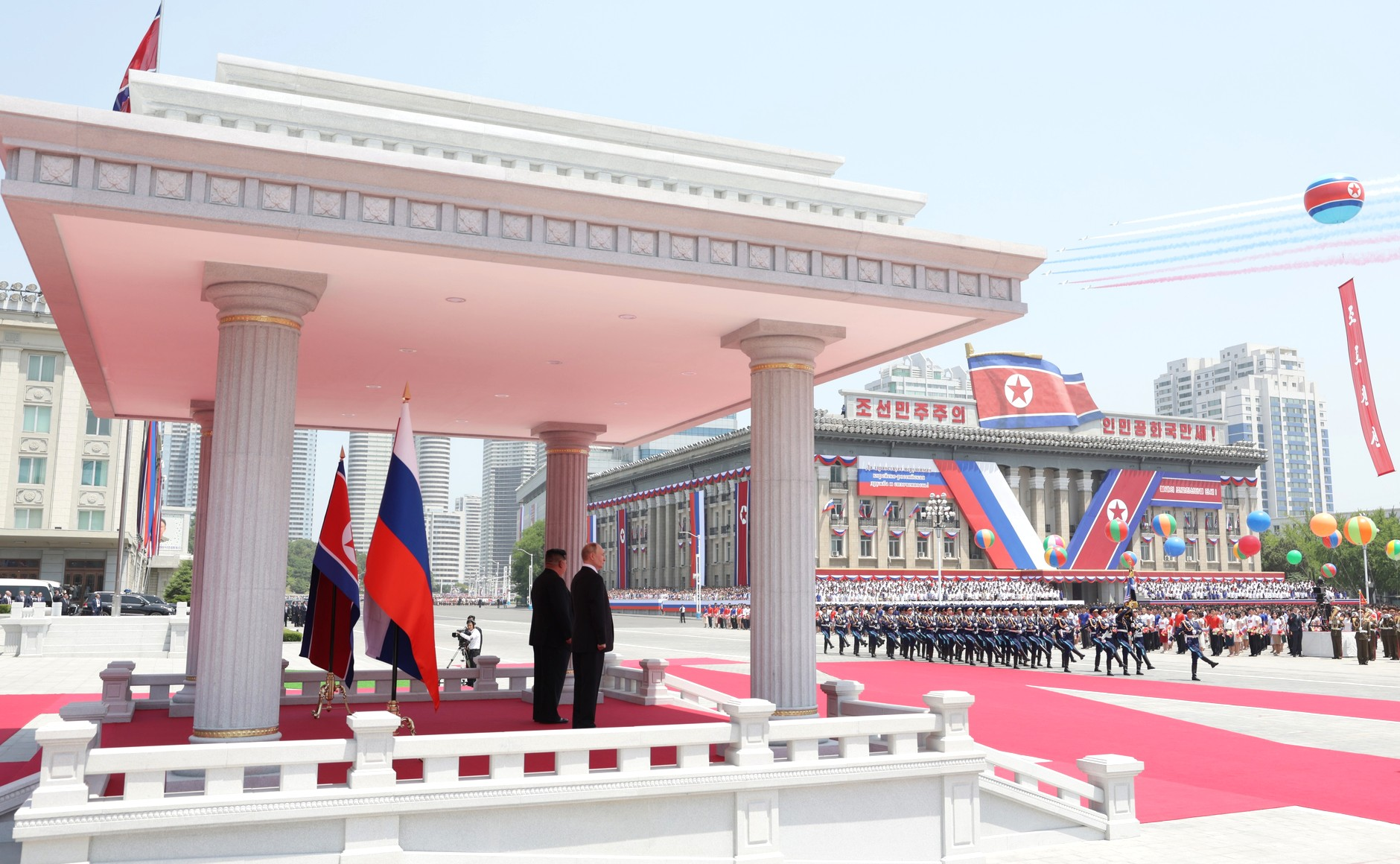
Putin and North Korean leader Kim Jong Un in Pyongyang, North Korea, 19 June 2024

According to the Japan Times, Russia increased its economic support for North Korea in an attempt to balance against a potential US-led push to topple the Kim Jong-un regime. In the event of regime collapse, Russia is worried about losing regional influence as well as the possibility of American troops being deployed to Russia's Eastern border. TransTeleCom (TTK), one of Russia's largest telecommunications companies, is also thought to provide a new internet connection to the country at a time when the US has engaged in denial of service attacks against North Korean hackers thought to be affiliated with the Reconnaissance General Bureau.

== Relations with Middle Eastern and North African countries ==
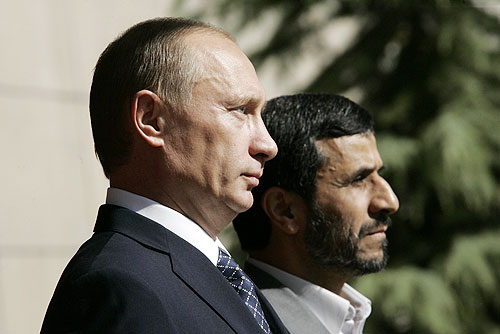
Putin with Iranian president, Mahmoud Ahmadinejad, 2007

On 16 October 2007 Putin visited Iran to participate in the Second Caspian Summit in Tehran, where he met with Iranian President Mahmoud Ahmadinejad. Other participants were leaders of Azerbaijan, Kazakhstan, and Turkmenistan. This was the first visit of a Soviet or Russian leader to Iran since Joseph Stalin's participation in the Tehran Conference in 1943, and thus marked a significant event in Iran–Russia relations. At a press conference after the summit Putin said that "all our (Caspian) states have the right to develop their peaceful nuclear programmes without any restrictions". During the summit it was also agreed that its participants, under no circumstances, would let any third-party state use their territory as a base for aggression or military action against any other participant.

Subsequently, under Medvedev's presidency, Iran–Russia relations were uneven: Russia did not fulfill the contract of selling to Iran the S-300, one of the most potent anti-aircraft missile systems currently existing. However, Russian specialists completed the construction of Iran and the Middle East's first civilian nuclear power facility, the Bushehr Nuclear Power Plant, and Russia has continuously opposed the imposition of economic sanctions on Iran by the U.S. and the EU, as well as warning against a military attack on Iran. Putin was quoted as describing Iran as a "partner", though he expressed concerns over the Iranian nuclear programme.

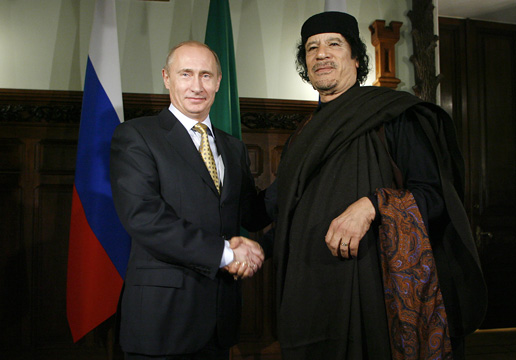
Putin meeting with Colonel Muammar Gaddafi in 2008

In April 2008, Putin visited Libya where he met the leader Muammar Gaddafi, the country welcomed the idea of creating an OPEC-like group of gas-exporting countries, Putin became first Russian President who visited Libya, he remarked the visit as "We are satisfied about the way in which we resolved this problem. I am absolutely convinced that the solution we have found will help the Russian and Libyan economies."

Putin condemned the foreign military intervention in Libya, he called UNSC Resolution 1973 as "defective and flawed," and added "It allows everything. It resembles medieval calls for crusades.", During the whole event, Putin condemned other steps taken by NATO. Upon the death of Muammar Gaddafi, Putin called it as "planned murder" by US, he asked "They showed to the whole world how he (Gaddafi) was killed," and "There was blood all over. Is that what they call a democracy?" Dmitri Trenin reports in The New York Times that from 2000 to 2010 Russia sold around $1.5 billion worth of arms to Syria, making Damascus Moscow's seventh-largest client. During the Syrian civil war, Russia threatened to veto any sanctions against the Syrian government, and continued to supply arms to the regime.

Putin opposed any foreign intervention. On 1 June 2012, in Paris, he rejected the statement of French President Francois Hollande who called on Bashar al-Assad to step down. Putin echoed the argument of the Assad regime that anti-regime militants were responsible for much of the bloodshed, rather than the shelling by the Syrian Armed Forces and the civilian killings attributed by survivors and Western governments to regime supporters. He asked "But how many of peaceful people (sic) were killed by so-called militants? Did you count? There are also hundreds of victims." He also talked about previous NATO interventions and their results, and asked "What is happening in Libya, in Iraq? Did they become safer? Where are they heading? Nobody has an answer."

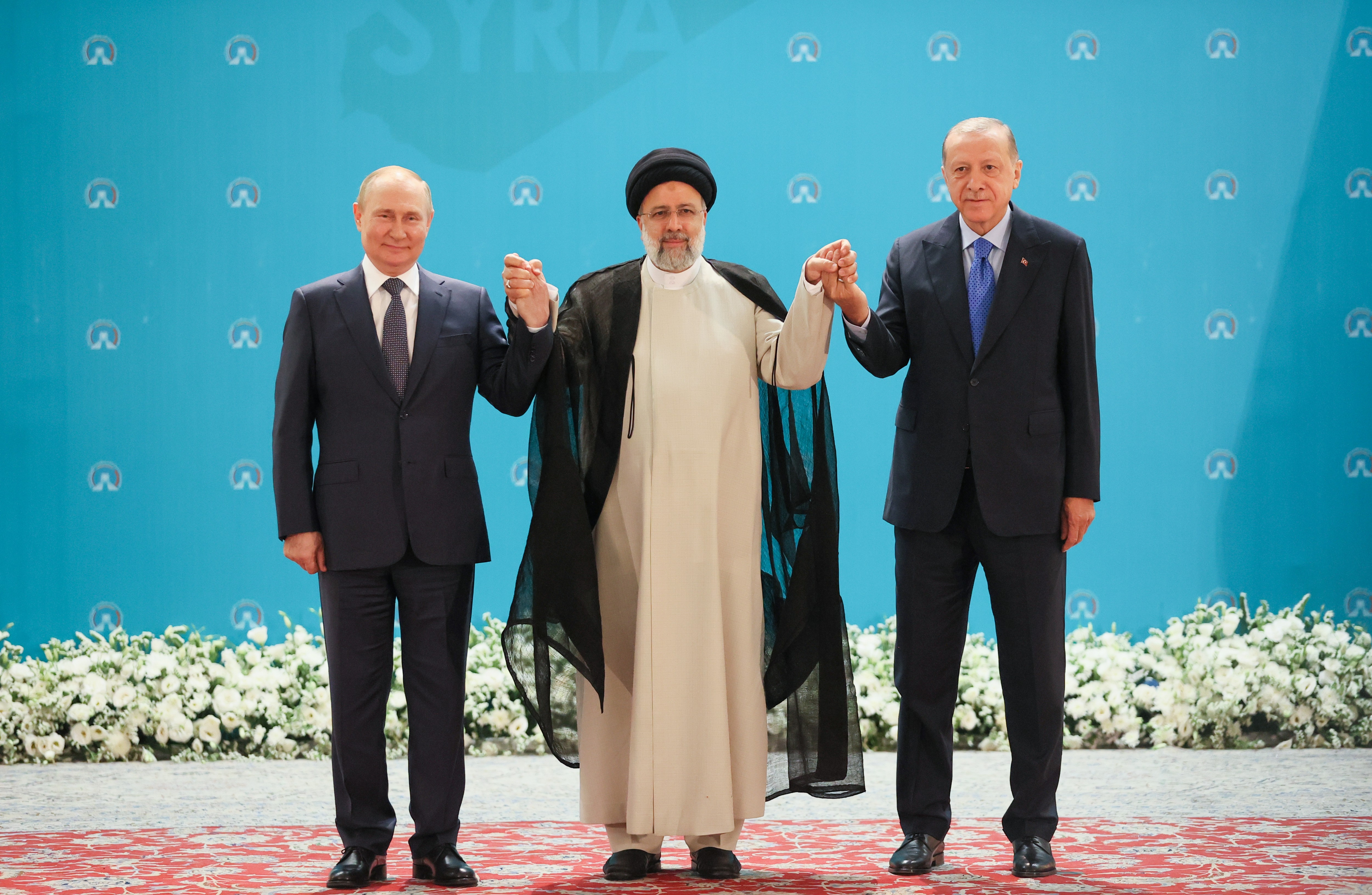
Putin with Iranian president, Ebrahim Raisi and Turkish president Recep Tayyip Erdoğan in Tehran, 19 July 2022

On 11 September 2013, an opinion, written by Putin, was published in The New York Times regarding international events related to the United States, Russia and Syria.

== Relations with post-Soviet states ==
A series of so-called color revolutions in the post-Soviet states, namely the Rose Revolution in Georgia in 2003, the Orange Revolution in Ukraine in 2004 and the Tulip Revolution in Kyrgyzstan in 2005, led to frictions in the relations of those countries with Russia. In December 2004, Putin criticised the Rose and Orange Revolution, according to him: "If you have permanent revolutions you risk plunging the post-Soviet space into endless conflict". During the protests following the 2011 Russian elections (in December 2011) Putin named the Orange Revolution as a potential precedent of what was going to happen in Russia.

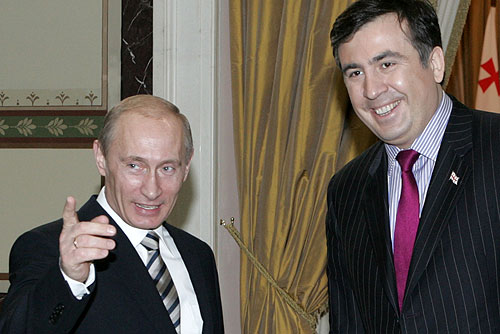
Meeting with Mikheil Saakashvili of Georgia in 2008

Apart from a clash of nationalist rhetorics with the common historical legacies of the Soviet Union and the Russian Empire, a number of economic disputes erupted between Russia and some neighbours, such as the 2006 Russian ban of Moldovan and Georgian wines. Moscow's policies under Putin towards these states were described as "efforts to bully democratic neighbors" by John McCain in 2007.

In some cases, such as the Russia–Ukraine gas disputes, the economic conflicts affected other European countries, for example when a January 2009 gas dispute with Ukraine led state-controlled Russian company Gazprom to halt its deliveries of natural gas to Ukraine, which left a number of European states, to which Ukraine transits Russian gas, to have serious shortages of natural gas in January 2009.

In an interview with the German historian Michael Stürmer about the Russian shut-down of gas to Ukraine in early 2005, Putin linked the shut-down to the Orange revolution, saying: "This has a price [the Orange revolution]. In spite of so much frustration we have stabilised the situation. In old days we concluded agreements with Ukraine year after year, and then included transit fees. The West Europeans had no idea that their energy security was a cliffhanger. By now we have a five-year agreement for transit to the E.U. This is an important step in the direction of European energy security".

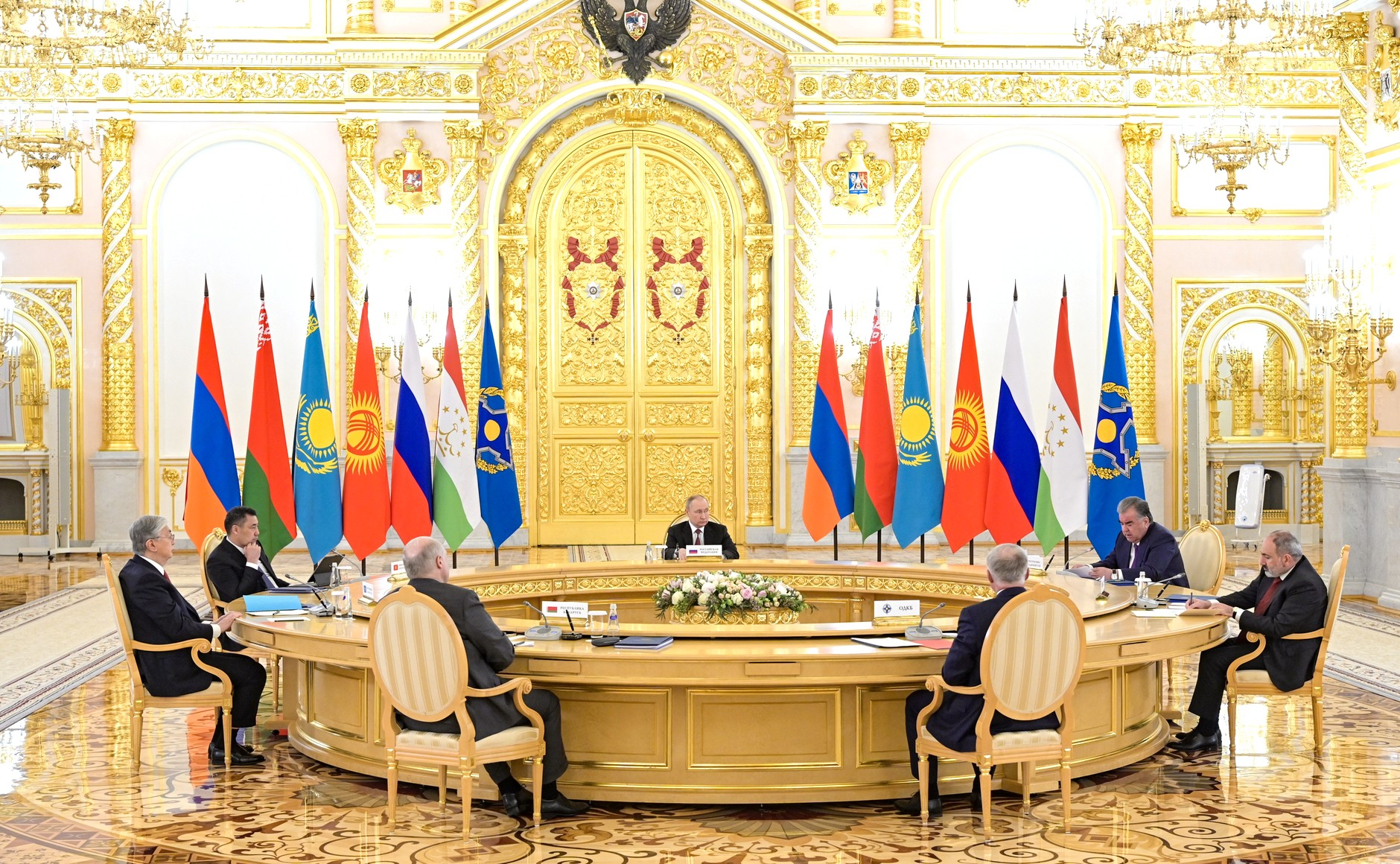
Putin hosted a meeting of the Russian-led military alliance, the Collective Security Treaty Organization (CSTO), in Moscow on 16 May 2022

In 2009, the Russia–Ukraine dispute was resolved by a long-term agreement on price formula, agreed by Prime Ministers Vladimir Putin of Russia and Prime Minister of Ukraine Yulia Tymoshenko (later, when the rising global oil prices prompted the rising gas prizes the agreement turned very unfavourable for Ukraine; in October 2011 Tymoshenko was found guilty of abuse of office when brokering the 2009 deal and was sentenced to seven years in prison).

The plans of Georgia and Ukraine to become members of NATO have caused some tensions between Russia and those states. In 2010, Ukraine did abandon these plans. In public Putin has stated that Russia has no intention of annexing any country.

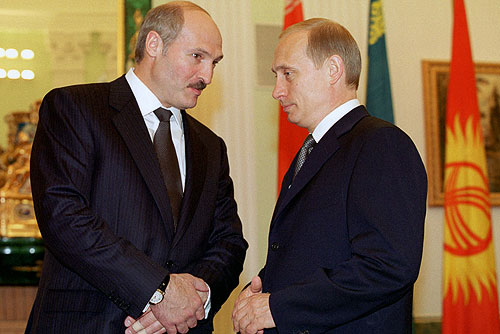
Belarus President Alexander Lukashenko of Belarus, with Vladimir Putin in 2002. Despite a number of economic disputes in the mid-2000s, Belarus has remained one of Russia's closest allies.

Putin, in his relations with Russo-centric neighbor and former Soviet Republic of Belarus, continued the general trend towards closer bi-lateral ties between the two countries, which has thus far stopped short of extending the depth of the Union of Russia and Belarus proposed and speculated by many media outlets both inside and outside Russia. In April 2008, Russian President Putin announced that Russia strongly opposed Ukraine and Georgia's NATO membership bids.

The proposed Eurasian Union with the most likely immediate members: Russia, Belarus and Kazakhstan

In August 2008, Georgian President Mikheil Saakashvili attempted to restore control over the breakaway South Ossetia, claiming this action was in response to Ossetian border attacks on Georgians and to alleged buildups of Russian non-peacekeeping forces. Russian "peacekeepers" fought alongside the South Ossetians as Georgian troops pushed into the province and seized most of the capital of Tskhinvali. However, the Georgian military was soon defeated in the resulting 2008 South Ossetia War after regular Russian forces entered South Ossetia and then Georgia proper, and also opened a second front in the other Georgian breakaway province of Abkhazia together with Abkhazian forces. During this conflict, according to high level French diplomat Jean-David Levitte, Putin intended to depose the Georgian President Mikheil Saakashvili and declared: "I am going to hang Saakashvili by the balls".

Putin blamed the 2008 war and the bad relations between Russia and Georgia as "the result of the policy that the Georgian authorities conducted back then and still attempt to conduct now"; he stated that Georgia is a "brotherly nation that hopefully will finally understand that Russia is not an enemy, but is a friend and the relations will be restored." Putin stated in 2009 Georgia could have kept Abkhazia and South Ossetia "within its territory" if it had treated the residents of Abkhazia and South Ossetia "with respect" (he claims they did "the opposite").

During the 2004 Ukrainian presidential election, Putin twice visited Ukraine before the election to show his support for Ukrainian Prime Minister Viktor Yanukovych, who was widely seen as a pro-Kremlin candidate, and he congratulated him on his anticipated victory before the official election returns had been in. Putin's personal support for Yanukovych was criticised as unwarranted interference in the affairs of a sovereign state (See also The Orange revolution). According to a document uncovered during the United States diplomatic cables leak Putin "implicitly challenged" the territorial integrity of Ukraine at the 4 April 2008, NATO-Russia Council Summit in Bucharest, Romania. In a televised meeting with military bloggers on 13 June 2023 Putin stated that, the winner of the 2004 Ukrainian presidential election, Viktor Yushchenko had come to power with the help of a coup d'etat, which "at least took place in a relatively peaceful way."

The President of Ukraine elected during the Orange Revolution, Viktor Yushchenko, was succeeded in 2010 by Viktor Yanukovych, that led to improved relations with Russia. Russia was able to expand the lease for the base for its Black Sea Fleet base in the Ukrainian city Sevastopol in exchange for lower gas prices for Ukraine (the 2010 Ukrainian–Russian Naval Base for Natural Gas treaty). The President of Kyrgyzstan since 2009, Almazbek Atambayev, wants to guide Kyrgyzstan towards the Customs Union of Belarus, Kazakhstan and Russia and has stated his country has a "common future" with its neighbours and Russia.

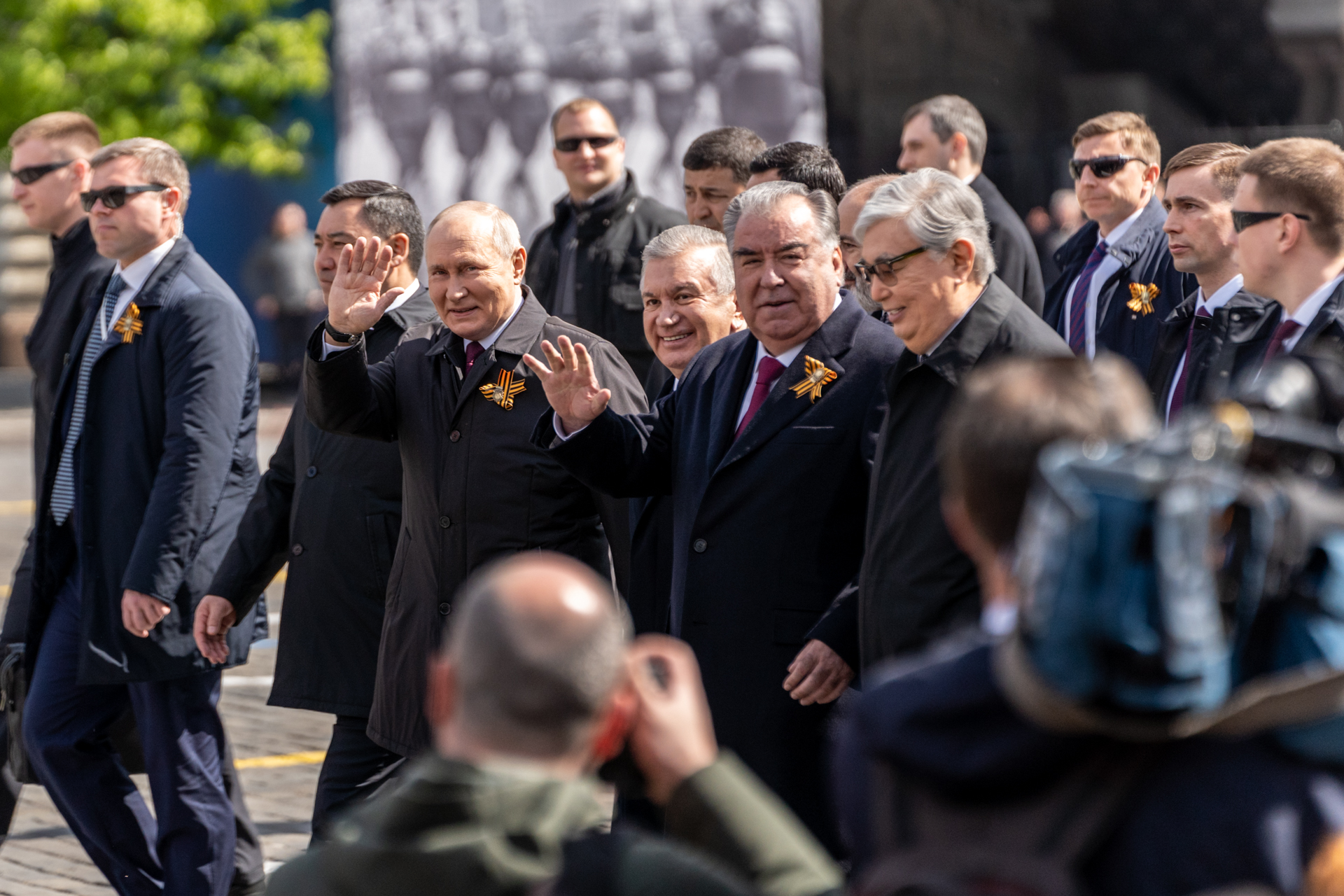
Putin and post-Soviet leaders from Central Asia at the 2023 Moscow Victory Day Parade

Despite existing or past tensions between Russia and most of the post-Soviet states, Putin has followed the policy of Eurasian integration. The Customs Union of Belarus, Kazakhstan and Russia has already brought partial economic unity between the three states, and the proposed Eurasian Union is said to be a continuation of this customs union. Putin endorsed the idea of a Eurasion Union in 2011, (the concept was proposed by the President of Kazakhstan in 1994). On 18 November 2011, the presidents of Belarus, Kazakhstan and Russia signed an agreement, setting a target of establishing the Eurasian Union by 2015. The agreement included the roadmap for the future integration and established the Eurasian Commission (modelled on the European Commission) and the Eurasian Economic Space, which started work on 1 January 2012.

=== Intervention in Ukraine and annexation of Crimea ===
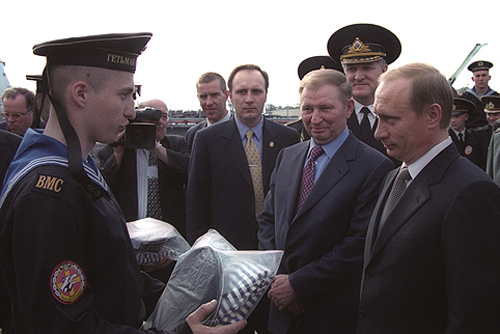
President Putin in Sevastopol (Crimea) aboard the Ukrainian Navy frigate Hetman Sahaidachny with Ukrainian President Leonid Kuchma on 18 April 2000

During the 2008 Bucharest summit Vladimir Putin stated that Ukraine "in its current form" was an artificial creation because the USSR had gifted it from Russia eastern and southern Ukraine and that Crimea was given to Ukraine by the Presidium of the Supreme Soviet. Putin also claimed that one third of the population of Ukraine was ethnical Russian. According to the October 2010 Springer Publishing publication Key Players and Regional Dynamics in Eurasia: The Return of the 'Great Game' Putin also said to U.S. President George W. Bush that if Ukraine would join Nato Russia would detach eastern Ukraine and Crimea from Russia and would graft it on to Russia. In a televised meeting with military bloggers on 13 June 2023 Putin stated a Ukrainian entry in NATO as discussed in 2008 would mean that "historical territories with a Russian-speaking population are in NATO."

In a July 2013 visit to Kyiv, Putin stated that whatever Ukraine would decide about its future "we still meet again sometime and somewhere" "because we are one people."

On 27 February 2014, Russian troops captured strategic sites across Crimea, Although Russia initially claimed their military was not involved in the events, Putin later admitted that troops were deployed to "stand behind Crimea's self-defence forces". The same day the pro-Russian Aksyonov government in Crimea was installed, they organised the Crimean status referendum and the declaration of Crimea's independence on 16 March 2014. Russia formally incorporated Crimea on 18 March 2014. Russia was excluded one week later from the G8 group as a result of its annexation of Crimea. On 18 March 2014 Putin made gave a historical speech about the situation in Crimea. In this speech Putin stated that Russia will always defend the interests of Russian-speaking Ukrainians by using political, diplomatic and legal means. In the speech Putin also insisted that Russia had no intention to invade or seize other regions of Ukraine. Putin also claimed in his speech that the new leaders in Ukraine included "neo-Nazis, Russophobes and anti-Semites" and said: "Don't believe those who try to frighten you with Russia and who scream that other regions will follow after Crimea", "we do not want a partition of Ukraine".

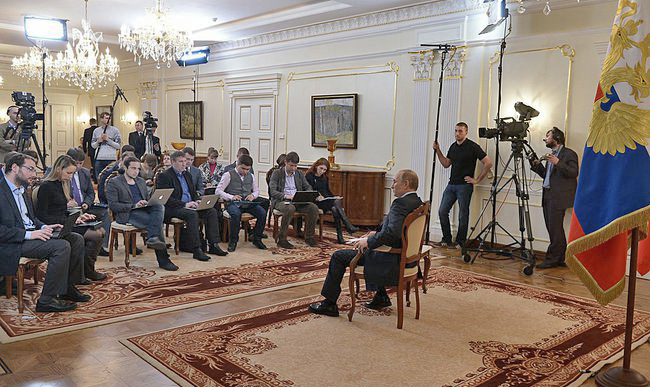
Vladimir Putin speaks to the press on 4 March about the annexation of Crimea.

Russia's Permanent Representative to the United Nations Vitaly Churkin told the UN Security Council on 4 March 2014 that ousted Ukrainian President Viktor Yanukovych had asked Russia to send troops across the Russia–Ukraine border to protect civilians via a letter to President Putin on 1 March 2014. On 4 March 2014 Putin answered questions of reporters about the situation in Crimea. In this interview he claimed that his biggest concern was "the rampage of reactionary forces, nationalist and anti-Semitic forces going on in certain parts of Ukraine, including Kiev." According to Putin the ousting of Yanukovych had been illegal. Putin also told journalists "if I do decide to use the Armed Forces, this will be a legitimate decision in full compliance with both general norms of international law, since we have the appeal of the legitimate President." Earlier on 28 February 2014 BBC News reported Yanukovych as insisting that military action was "unacceptable" and as stating that he would not request Russian military intervention.

The annexation of Crimea took place during wider pro-Russian protests across southern and eastern Ukraine in which the Donetsk People's Republic and Luhansk People's Republic, armed Russian-backed separatist groups in the Donbas region of Ukraine unilaterally declared themselves independent from Ukraine (in April 2014) leading to armed conflict with Ukrainian government forces. The proclaimed republics remained unrecognised by any of the UN member states including Russia, although Russia did (since February 2017) recognises documents issued by it such as identity documents, diplomas, birth and marriage certificates and vehicle registration plates. From 2019 to May 2021 Russia issued over 650,000 internal Russian passports among an unconfirmed overall population of the unrecognised republics. Russia has been accused of aiding, including sending military troops to fight alongside separatists forces, the breakaway republics but has always denied this.

In a visit to Crimea in August 2015, Putin stated that Russians and Ukrainians are "practically one people."

In the March 2015 documentary Crimea. The Way Home Putin claimed he told top security officials of his intent to annex Crimea on 24 February 2014. In the documentary Putin stated his decision to deploy Russian troops in Crimea was necessary to protect the population of Crimea "from violence and repression by Ukrainian nationalists."

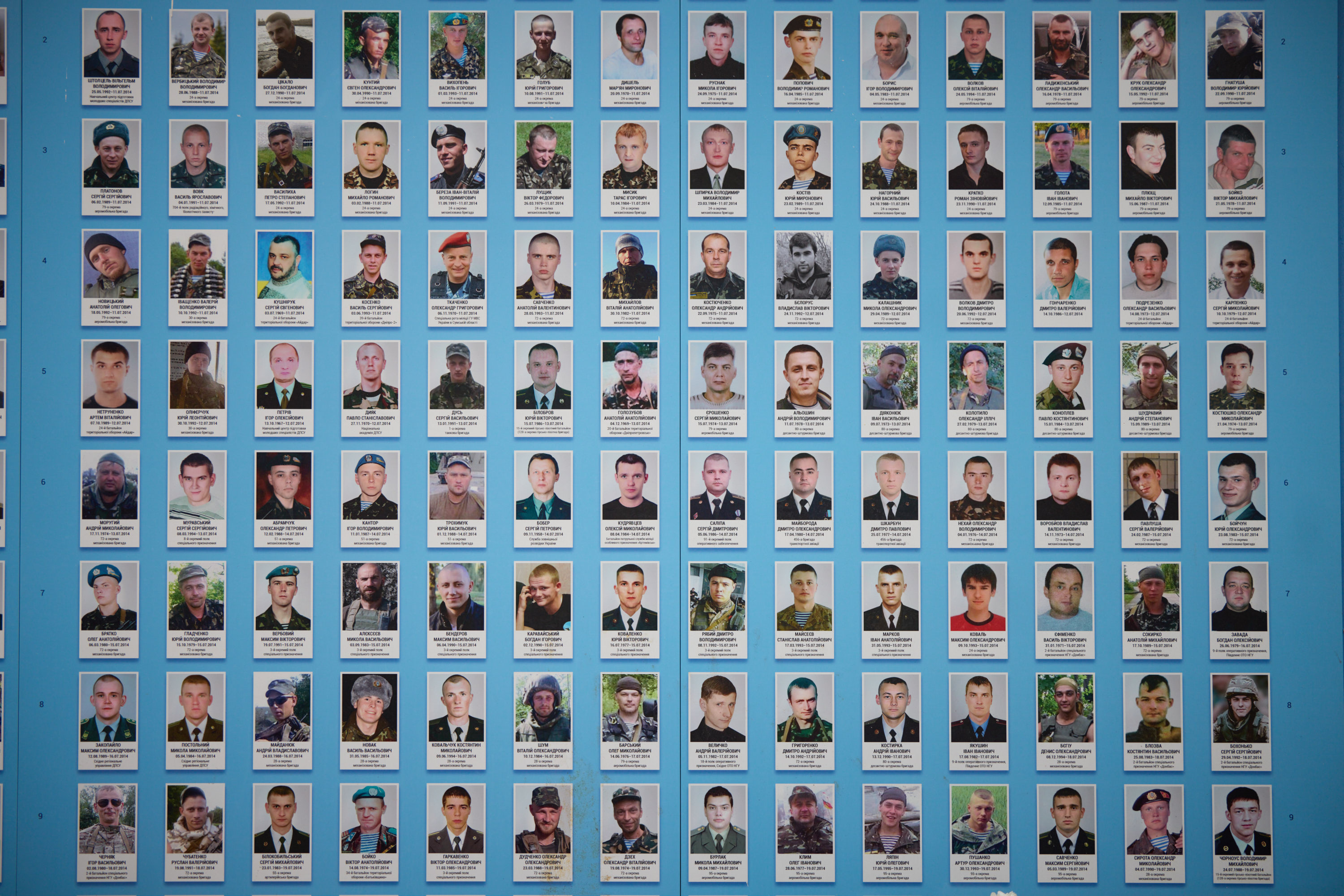
A mural of Ukrainian soldiers who died during the war in Donbas in 2014

In the Direct Line with Vladimir Putin of April 2015 Putin stated that he did "presume it's impossible" that a war between Russian and Ukraine would break out.

When in June 2017 the Ukrainian parliament enshrined in law Ukraine's priority of acceding to NATO membership Putin's press secretary Dmitry Peskov responded by saying that an eastern enlargement of NATO "threatens our security and the balance of forces in the Eurasian region. Naturally, the Russian side will take all measures needed to rebalance the situation and ensure our own security."

On 14 September 2020, Ukrainian President Volodymyr Zelenskyy approved Ukraine's new National Security Strategy, "which provides for the development of the distinctive partnership with NATO with the aim of membership in NATO."

==== Military build-up around Ukraine ====
In March and April 2021, the Russian Armed Forces began massing thousands of personnel and military equipment near Russia's border with Ukraine and in Crimea, representing the largest mobilization since the Russian annexation of Crimea in 2014. The troops were partially withdrawn by June 2021.

In the essay On the Historical Unity of Russians and Ukrainians published on 12 July 2021 on Kremlin.ru Putin argues that Russians and Ukrainians, along with Belarusians, are one people, belonging to what has historically been known as the triune Russian nation.

Russia again build-up its army presence around Ukraine in October 2021, this time with more soldiers and with deployments on new fronts; by December over 100,000 Russian troops were massed around Ukraine on three sides, including Belarus from the north and Crimea from the south. Despite the Russian military build-ups, Russian officials from November 2021 to 20 February 2022 repeatedly denied that Russia had plans to invade Ukraine.

In the first weeks of February 2022 Russia was demanding that NATO would not expand further to the east, Ukraine should be precluded from ever joining NATO, and NATO should significantly scale back its presence and activities in Eastern Europe. Press secretary Peskov stated that Putin showed his readiness to negotiate in his meetings with Western leaders.

On 21 February 2022, Russia officially recognised the Donetsk People's Republic and the Luhansk People's Republic.

==== 2022 Russian invasion of Ukraine ====
===== 2022 =====
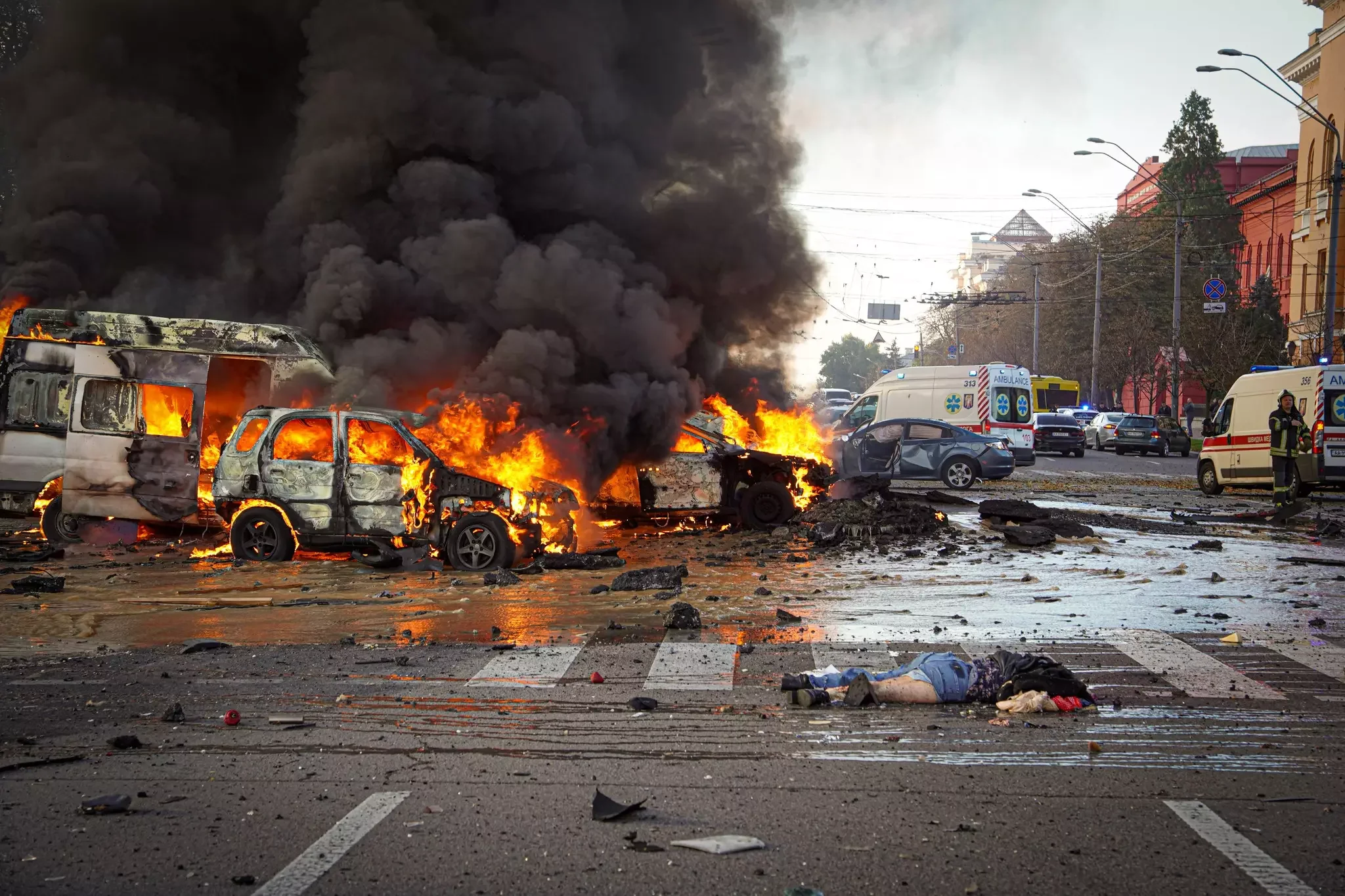
Streets of Kyiv following Russian rocket strikes on 10 October 2022

On 24 February 2022, Russia launched a full-scale invasion of Ukraine. In his televised address announcing the invasion, Putin used the false image of Ukraine as a neo-Nazi state. Putin called the "denazification" of Ukraine one of the goals of the invasion and claimed that "neo-Nazis seized power in Ukraine". Putin also mentioned (to stop eastern) NATO enlargement was one of the reasons for the invasion. Addressing the citizens of Ukraine, he linked Russia's actions with self-defense against the threats created for it and "an even greater disaster than the one that is happening today", saying: "No matter how hard it is, I ask you to understand this and call for interaction in order to turn this tragic page and move forward together." Putin claimed there were no plans to occupy Ukrainian territory and that he supported the right of the peoples of Ukraine to self-determination (Note: In a televised meeting with military bloggers on 13 June 2023 Putin stated Russia respects those who in Ukraine "want to feel like a Ukrainian."), saying: "Our plans do not include the occupation of Ukrainian territories. We are not going to impose anything on anyone by force. At the same time, we hear that recently in the West there is talk that the documents signed by the Soviet totalitarian regime, securing the outcome of World War II, should no longer be upheld." Putin claimed Russia was carrying out a special military operation in order to protect people in Donbas "who have been suffering from abuse and genocide by the Kiev regime for eight years." According to Putin the objective of the invasion where the demilitarization and denazification of Ukraine. Meanwhile the Russian Ministry of Defence assured that its troops were not targeting Ukrainian cities, but that its actions were limited to surgically striking and incapacitating Ukrainian military infrastructure. The ministry claimed that there were no threats whatsoever to the civilian population.

At a meeting of the Security Council of Russia on 25 February, he called the Ukrainian authorities "a gang of drug addicts and neo-Nazis".

In March 2022, Belgian Prime Minister Bart De Wever said during a radio interview that Russian President Vladimir Putin will not end Russia's invasion of Ukraine, as he is a "psychopath" and a "madman", adding: "[Putin] said: ‘I will squash the Russians who are against me like mosquitoes’. When did I hear that before? I think here, 70 years ago." De Wever had earlier assessed that Vladimir Putin and Adolf Hitler were similarly motivated: "Germany was humiliated after the First World War, Russia after the Cold War. In both countries, an autocratic leader emerged with a clear ambition: to undo the humiliation. In Germany, it was Hitler, in Russia, Putin." De Wever went on to explain that this humiliation was taken personally by both men, who had each professionally represented their respective countries (Hitler as a soldier, and Putin as a KGB agent): "Both then unexpectedly resorted to irrational behavior. What the Sudetenland was to Hitler, Crimea was to Putin. There are many similarities."

In a televised meeting with military bloggers on 13 June 2023 Putin claimed that Russia and Ukraine had in March 2022 in Istanbul came to "a good agreement on how to resolve the current situation by peaceful means" but that the Ukrainians had "threw it away" after the withdrawal of Russian troops from Kyiv after the (failed) Russian 2022 offensive on Kyiv. According to Putin Ukraine had agreed to curb Neo-Nazism in Ukraine through the "introducing appropriate restrictions in the law in Ukraine", but this had failed to happen intentionally. On 14 June 2024 Putin claimed that "Russian troops were near Kyiv in March 2022", but "There was no political decision to storm the three-million-strong city; it was a coercive operation to establish peace."

On 17 June 2022 Putin stated at the St. Petersburg International Economic Forum that Russian was not against Ukraine joining the EU, "because it is not a military organization, a military-political bloc, such as NATO."

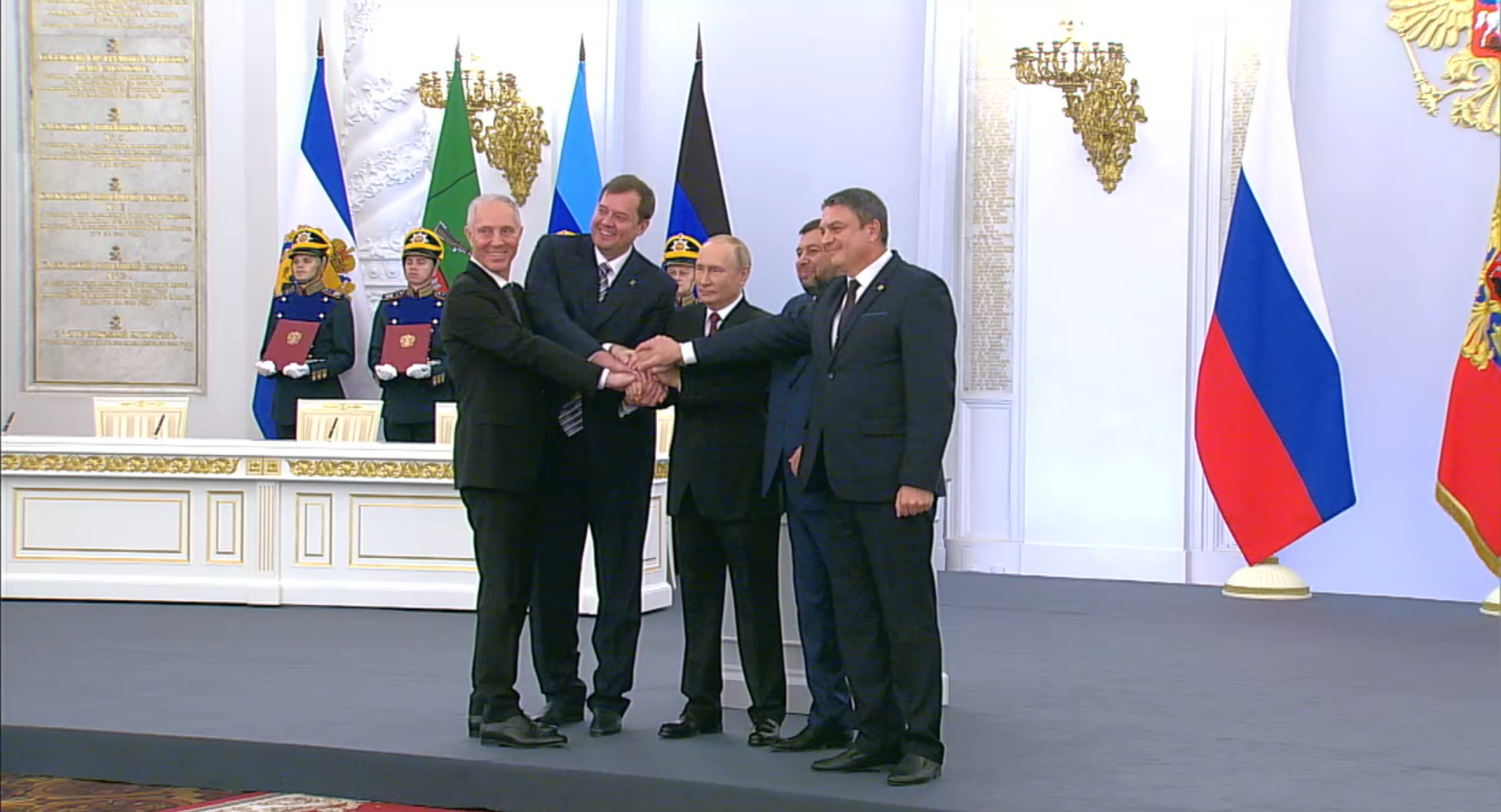
Putin and Russian appointed administrators of its occupied territories in Ukraine Volodymyr Saldo, Yevgeny Balitsky, Denis Pushilin and Leonid Pasechnik following the annexation of these territories on 30 September 2022.

On 21 September 2022, Putin announced a "partial" mobilization.

On 30 September 2022, amid the ongoing invasion of Ukraine, Russia unilaterally declared its annexation of areas in and around four Ukrainian regions — Luhansk, Donetsk, Zaporizhzhia and Kherson — despite only partially occupying the regions and gradually losing control as a result of successful Ukrainian counteroffensives in the south and east. In his speech following the formal signing of the annexation Putin denounced the 1991 Belovezh Accords that formally ended the Soviet Union while also claiming "There is no Soviet Union, the past cannot be brought back. And Russia today does not need it any more. We are not striving for this."

On 10 October 2022 at a meeting with the Security Council of Russia, on the first day of the months long Russian attack against Ukrainian infrastructure, Putin said the missile strikes were in retaliation for the alleged Ukrainian attack on the Crimean Bridge, which he called an act of "terrorism", adding that if such attacks continued, the response would be "severe".

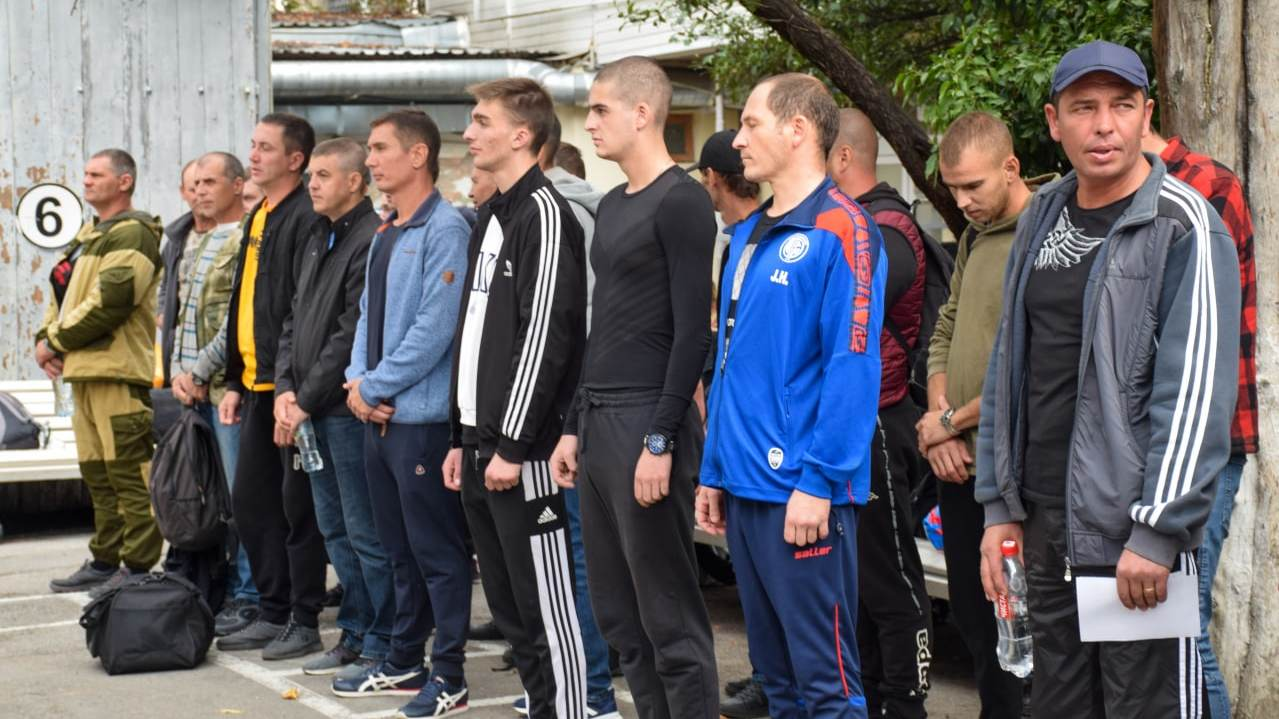
Civilians from occupied Crimea drafted into the Russian army during the 2022 Russian mobilization

On 21 December 2022 Putin stated a clash with "hostile forces" in Ukraine had been inevitable and "because it's inevitable, better today than tomorrow." The following day Putin told reporters that Russia's goal was "to end this war, we are striving for this and will continue to strive."

In an interview on 25 December 2022 Putin stated that Russia since 2014 tried to resolve the situation in Ukraine peacefully, but that "what underlies everything is the policy of our geopolitical opponents that's aimed at breaking up Russia, the historical Russia." Putin also stated that Russia was ready to "hold talks on the situation around Ukraine and is ready to engage with everyone involved." In the interview Putin avowed that Russia couldn't treat Ukraine cynically, as allegedly "the West" did, because "We have a different philosophy, different approach to life, people."

On 28 December 2022 Putin's press secretary Dmitry Peskov stated that "no Ukrainian 'peace plan' is possible if it does not take into account the modern reality - with Russia's territory, with four new regions joining Russia."

===== 2023 =====
In a phone conversation with President of Turkey Recep Tayyip Erdoğan on 5 January 2023 Putin repeated this demand stating he "reaffirmed Russia's openness to a serious dialogue, provided that the Kiev authorities fulfill the well–known and repeatedly voiced requirements and take into account the new territorial realities."

In his 2023 new year speech Putin claimed that "Western elites" had hypocritically assured Russia of their peaceful intentions, including the settlement of the conflict in the Donbas, but Putin alleged that in reality they had "in every possible way encouraged the neo-Nazis. ... And today it is openly admitting this, no longer embarrassed. They are cynically using Ukraine and its people to weaken and split Russia." Putin also stated that "Russian servicemen, militias, volunteers are now fighting for their native land, for truth and justice. For guarantees of peace and security for Russia to be reliably provided. All of them are our heroes, it is the hardest time for them now".

At a UN Security Council meeting of 14 January 2023 Permanent Representative of Russia to the United Nations Vasily Nebenzya stated that "only when the threat for Russia no longer emanates from the territory of Ukraine and when the discrimination against the Russian-speaking population of this country ends" it could stop its military actions. Nebenzya continued that "Otherwise, Moscow will get what it wants militarily". Nebenzya further claimed that Russia does not want "the destruction of Ukraine as a state, its de-Ukrainianisation and forced Russification".

In an interview on broadcast on 15 January 2023 on Russia-1 TV channel Putin stated about the military invasion of Ukraine that "The dynamics are positive. Everything is developing within the plan of the Defense Ministry and the General Staff. And I hope that our fighters will please us more than once again with the results of their combat work."

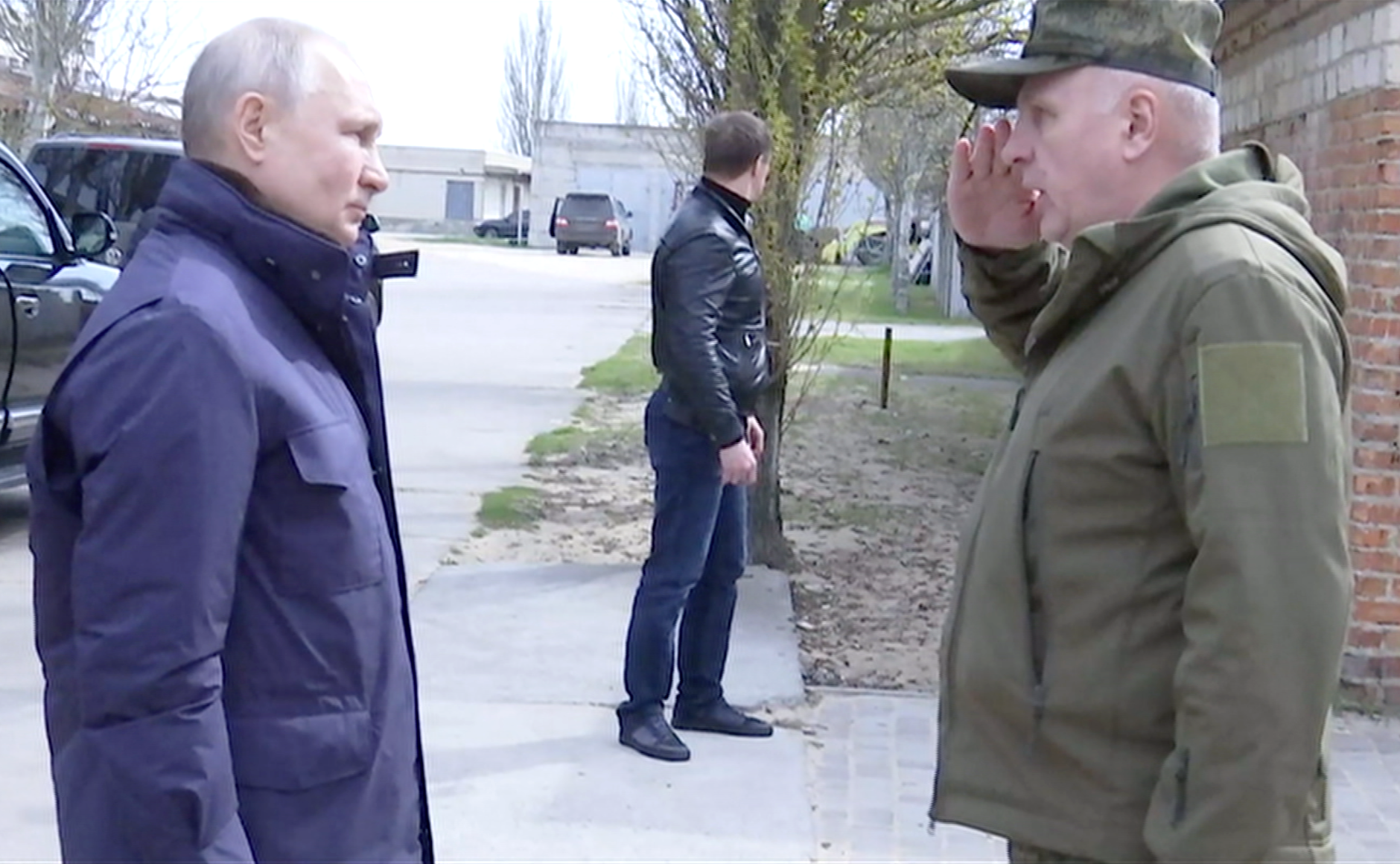
Putin and Russian Colonel general Oleg Makarevich on 17 April 2023 during Putin's visit to Russian army troops in Kherson Oblast

In his 21 February 2023 address to the joint houses of the Russian parliament Putin stated that "We are not at war with the people of Ukraine. They've become hostages of their own regime and its Western masters." In the speech Putin claimed that "The West began remaking Ukraine into an anti-Russia in order to tear away these historical lands from our country." In the speech Putin alleged that there was a plan prepared by Kyiv and "the West" to launch a "punitive operation" in the Donbas just before Russia intervened. Putin also remarked that the war was about Russia's right to exist.

During a meeting with Valery Zorkin, the chairman of the Constitutional Court of Russia, while discussing a mid-17th century French map stated about Ukraine: "These lands were simply part of the Polish–Lithuanian Commonwealth, and then they were asked to become part of the Kingdom of Muscovy… And it was only later, after the October Revolution, that quasi-state formations began to form. The Soviet government created Soviet Ukraine. There was never any Ukraine in the history of humanity up to that point."

On 30 May 2023 Putin stated that Russia did strike the territory of Ukraine, but did so "with high-accuracy long-range weapons and targets precisely military infrastructure facilities, or warehouses with ammunition or fuel and lubricants used in combat operations." The strikes in reality targeted civilian areas beyond the battlefield, particularly critical power infrastructure, which is considered a war crime.

In a televised meeting with military bloggers on 13 June 2023 Putin stated that he did not believe that there was a need for further mobilisation in Russia since he ruled out a repeat of the (failed) Russian 2022 Kyiv offensive. He also told the bloggers that "On the whole, there are no fundamental changes as of today regarding the objectives that we had outlined at the beginning of the operation. There are no changes." Putin also claimed that conscript soldiers would not be sent "to the zone of the special military operation", including to the "new regions of Russia" (the annexed Ukrainian regions Luhansk, Donetsk, Zaporizhzhia and Kherson). Putin also claimed that because Ukraine had denounced the 1922 Declaration of the Creation of the Union of Soviet Socialist Republics "Ukraine should have left the Soviet Union (USSR) with what it came with" but in "But in 1645 or 1654 there was no Ukraine.” According to Putin Vladimir Lenin had founded Ukraine in 1922. Putin had concluded from studying archival documents "on the transfer of Donbass from Russia" and had concluded that it "was not based on discussions with the population, but was based only on Lenin's decision." Putin also stated that Ukraine "whatever it is, it exists, and we must treat it with respect" but that it should not exist at the expense of Russia and that "If they want to live in our historical territories, then you need to influence on their political leadership in such a way as to build normal relations with Russia, so that no one from these territories threatens us." Putin also told the bloggers "we can't just leave Crimea - we can't, it's impossible. This would be a betrayal on our part." Putin also claimed that Russia would continue to "selectively strike targets in Ukraine", and not hit residential areas, "like these idiots."

At a plenary meeting of the St. Petersburg International Economic Forum Putin stated on 13 June 2023 that "Russia has every right to consider the denazification of Ukraine one of the main goals." According to Putin this had to be so because he believed "today's Ukrainian authorities" protected "as individuals and their ideology" Banderites (a faction of the Organization of Ukrainian Nationalists in World War II). At the conference Putin also claimed that "many lifelong Jewish friends" had told him that Ukrainian President Volodymyr Zelenskyy "isn’t Jewish but a disgrace to the Jewish people." Zelenskyy was born to Jewish parents.

In an interview aired 5 September 2023 (with Pavel Zarubin) Putin claimed, referring to Ukrainian President Zelenskyy, that "Western managers put an ethnic Jew in charge of Ukraine." According to Putin "This makes for an extremely disgusting situation in which an ethnic Jew is covering up the glorification of Nazism and of those who led the Holocaust in Ukraine, which brought the destruction of 1.5 million of people." (Note: Contemporary estimates about the number of Jews killed in the whole Soviet Union (that included the Ukrainian SSR) range from Timothy D. Snyder's estimate that at least 1.7 million Jews killed to Yad Vashem's estimate that between 1 and 1.1 million Jews were killed.)

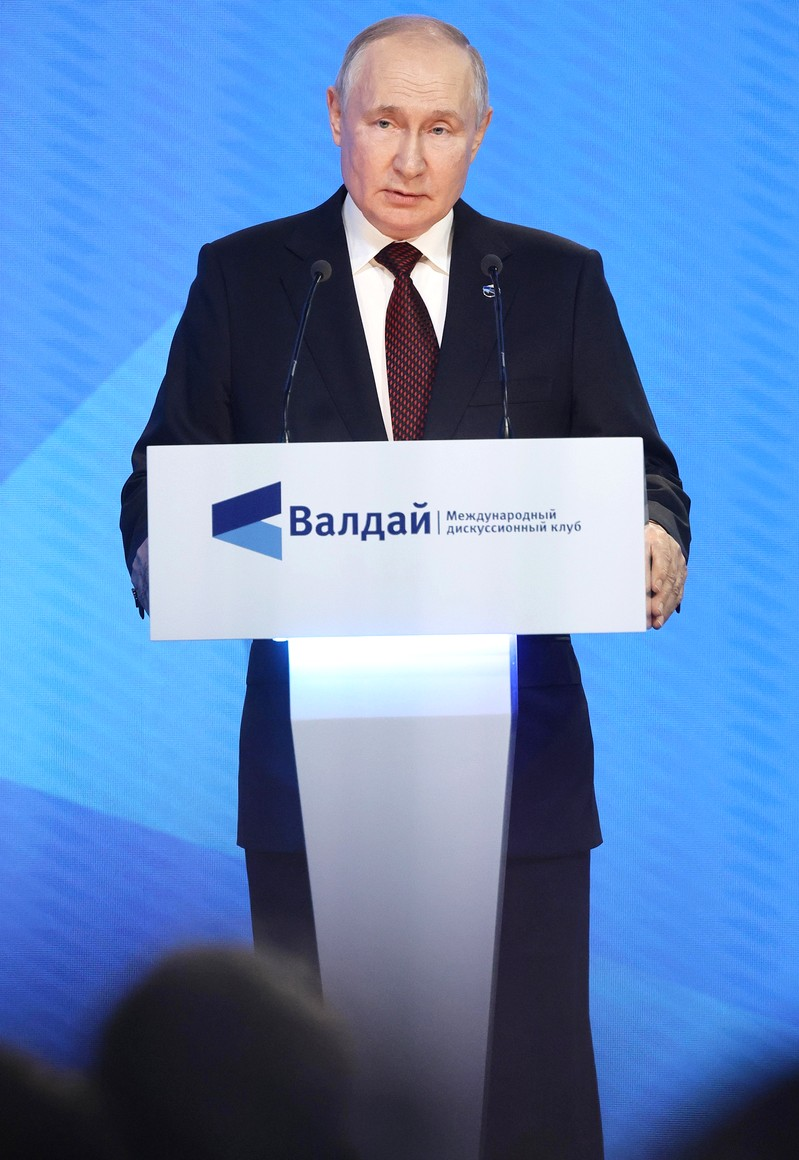
Putin speeching at the Valdai Discussion Club of 5 October 2023

In a speech and a Q&A session on 5 October 2023 at the annual meeting of the Valdai Discussion Club Putin stated "We did not start the so-called war in Ukraine. On the contrary, we are trying to end it. We did not stage a coup in Kiev." Putin claimed the war was started by "the Kiev regime with the direct support of the West" and that "the special military operation is aimed at stopping it. He went on to claim "The Ukrainian crisis is not a territorial conflict. Russia is the largest country in terms of territory in the world.” According to him "the meaning of our actions in Ukraine" was that "civilization is not territory, but people." Putin also stated that Odesa "of course" is "a Russian city, but it’s a bit Jewish. Just a tiny bit.” and that the city could "become both a bone of discord and a symbol of conflict resolution." Putin also claimed that the standing ovations Yaroslav Hunka (although at the moment Zelenskyy was unaware of Hunka's past membership of the 14th Waffen Grenadier Division of the Waffen-SS) received from President Zelenskyy (on 22 September 2023 in the) Canadian parliament) was "a sign of the Nazification of Ukraine" and "This is precisely why it is necessary to denazify Ukraine. Putin also assured the audience that "we have never been against" Ukrainian EU membership, but that Ukrainian NATO-membership "we have always been against it, since it threatens our security."

At a meeting with the Civic Chamber of the Russian Federation on 3 November 2023 Putin stated that in the 16th century Ukraine had "consisted of three oblasts: the city of Kyiv and the oblasts of Kyiv, Zhytomyr and Chernihiv." According to Putin "The Soviet Union was formed and a vast Ukraine was formed, first and foremost, to a significant extent, at the expense of the southern Russian lands - the entire Black Sea region and so on - although all of these cities, as you know, were founded by Catherine the Great after a series of wars with Turkey, the Ottoman Empire." Putin claimed that modern Russia had "come to terms with" the loss of Ukraine after the collapse of the USSR, but "when they started destroying everything of Russian origin there, that was obviously unacceptable! And they ended up declaring that Russians are not indigenous to these lands – well, this is complete nonsense. And at the same time, they began to exterminate Russians in Donbas." Putin stated that "If everything had been fine in Ukraine, if Russian people, the Russian language and Russian culture had been treated normally, and if there had not been those coups d'état" the 2014 Russian annexation of Crimea and Russo-Ukrainian War would not have taken place but they had to take place "to protect people from this Nazi abomination".

In the December 2023 Direct Line with Vladimir Putin Putin stated "there will only be peace in Ukraine when we achieve our aims"; those "objectives do not change", he said, listing "denazification, demilitarisation and its neutral status". He claimed that Ukrainian far-right leader of the radical militant wing of the Organization of Ukrainian Nationalists (during World War II) Stepan Bandera was Ukraine’s "national hero" and brought up again the 98-year-old SS veteran Hunka. He stated there would be no reprise of the 2022 Russian mobilization stating "Why do we need a mobilization? There is no need.” Putin claimed again that "Russians and Ukrainians are one people, and what’s happening right now is a tragedy" and reiterated that "All of southeastern Ukraine was in favor of Russia because these are historically Russian territories. What does Ukraine have to do with anything? Odesa is a Russian city — everybody knows that. They’ve made up a bunch of historical nonsense." About the September 2022 Russian annexed territories of Ukraine Putin said that a budget allocated more than a trillion rubles ($11.15 billion) annually for the development of these (in his words) "new regions" and their "integration into the economic and social life" of Russia; he stated that "Of course, in Russia’s other regions, the situation is fundamentally better, because the authorities in Kyiv “did not give these regions the attention they were due.”

===== 2024 =====
Talking to journalists in Tashkent (Uzbekistan) Putin claimed that since Ukrainian President Volodymyr Zelenskyy’s five-year term had come to an end and Ukraine had not hold presidential elections Zelenskyy’s presidential powers should have been transferred to the speaker of the parliament Ruslan Stefanchuk. Putin referred to Art. 111 of the Constitution of Ukraine to back up his claim. (Note: It is likely that Putin meant to refer to Art. 112 of the Constitution of Ukraine that does mention "In the event of the pre-term termination of authority of the President of Ukraine... [his/her powers] shall be vested in the Chairperson of the Verkhovna Rada of Ukraine" (speaker of the parliament); Art. 111 does not mention the speaker of the parliament.) Putin said that this was his "preliminary assessment" and that an "in-depth analysis is needed." The same day Stefanchuk responded on social media "It’s great that the Constitution of Ukraine is now read in russia", and he recommended "that inquisitive readers refrain from selective reading of the text of our Constitution and pay attention to Art. 108.1: ‘The President of Ukraine shall exercise his powers until the newly elected President of Ukraine takes office.’"

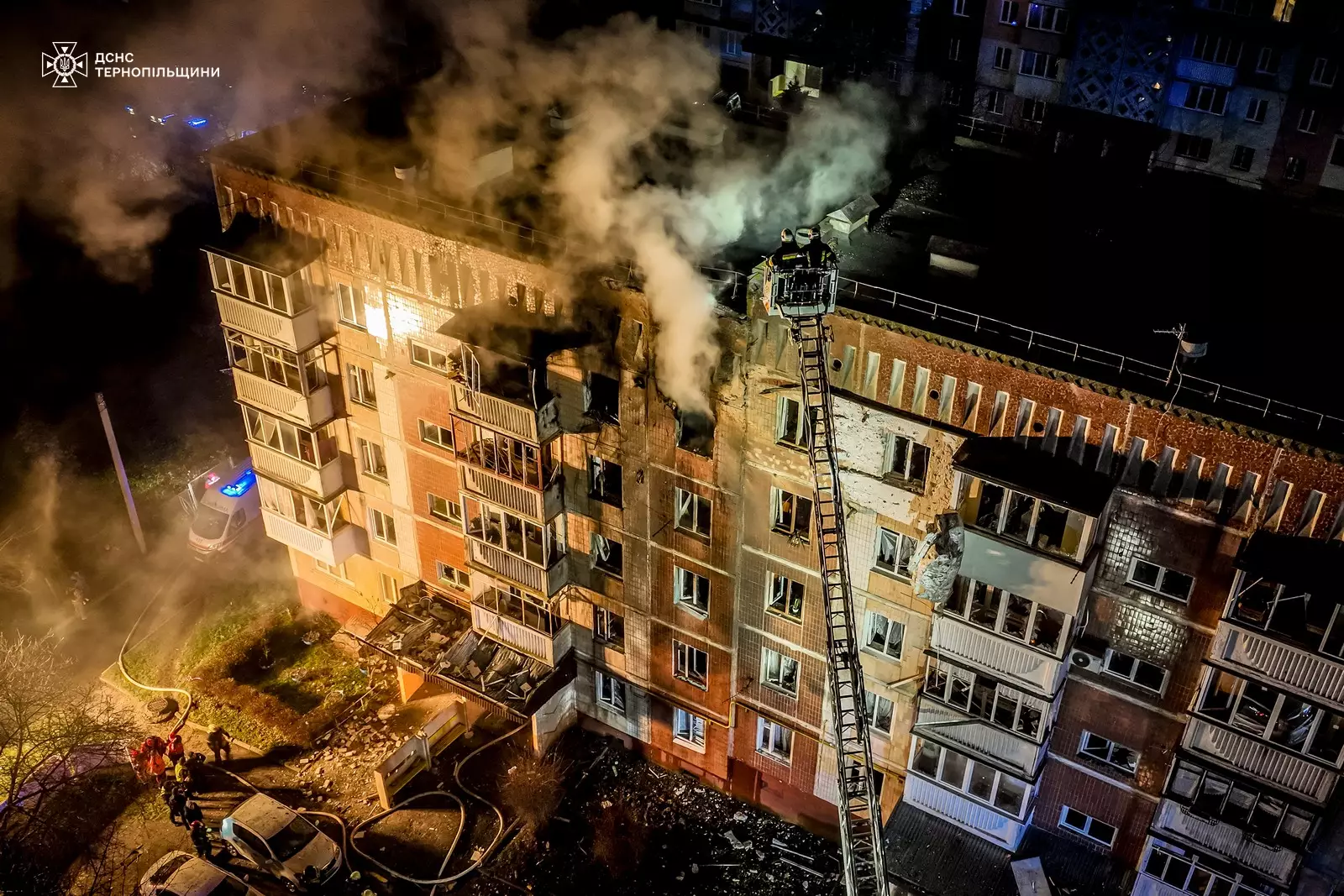
Residential building in Ternopil after a Russian drone attack on 2 December 2024

At a speech at the Russian Foreign Ministry on 14 June 2024 Putin put forward his "conditions for ending hostilities in Ukraine." He stated that Ukraine had to "begin the actual withdrawal of troops from the territories of Donetsk, Luhansk, Kherson and Zaporizhzhia oblasts within the administrative borders." These borders had to be "as they existed at the time of their accession to Ukraine." (Note: On 14 June 2024 Russia was not holding all these territories Putin mentioned under its military control.) Additionally, Ukraine had to "officially announces the abandonment of plans to join NATO." After these conditions had been met "from our side, immediately, literally at that same moment, the order to cease fire and begin negotiations will be issued. I repeat, we will do this immediately." He claimed that the essence of this Russian proposal "is not about a temporary truce. It is not about freezing the conflict but about its final resolution." Putin listed Ukraine’s neutral and non-nuclear status and lifting sanctions against Russia as additional conditions for peaceful resolution. Putin also declared that in future peace negotiations Russia would insist on the "demilitarization and denazification" of Ukraine whose according to Putin "parameters were generally agreed upon by everyone back during the Istanbul talks in 2022. Putin also mentioned "Of course, the rights and freedoms of Russian-speaking citizens in Ukraine must be fully ensured." Putin stated that this plan was "another real concrete peace proposal", and if turned down by Ukraine and its allies, "then this is their problem, their political and moral responsibility for continuing the bloodshed". Putin also stated in the speech that "We would like such decisions — regarding the withdrawal of troops, non-aligned status, and starting a dialogue with Russia, on which the future existence of Ukraine depends — to be made independently in Kyiv, guided by the genuine national interests of the Ukrainian people. Not at the behest of the West. Although there are significant doubts about this." Later that day, President Zelenskyy told Sky TG24 television: "These messages are ultimatum messages. It's the same thing Hitler did, when he said 'give me a part of Czechoslovakia and it'll end here'."

===== 2025 =====
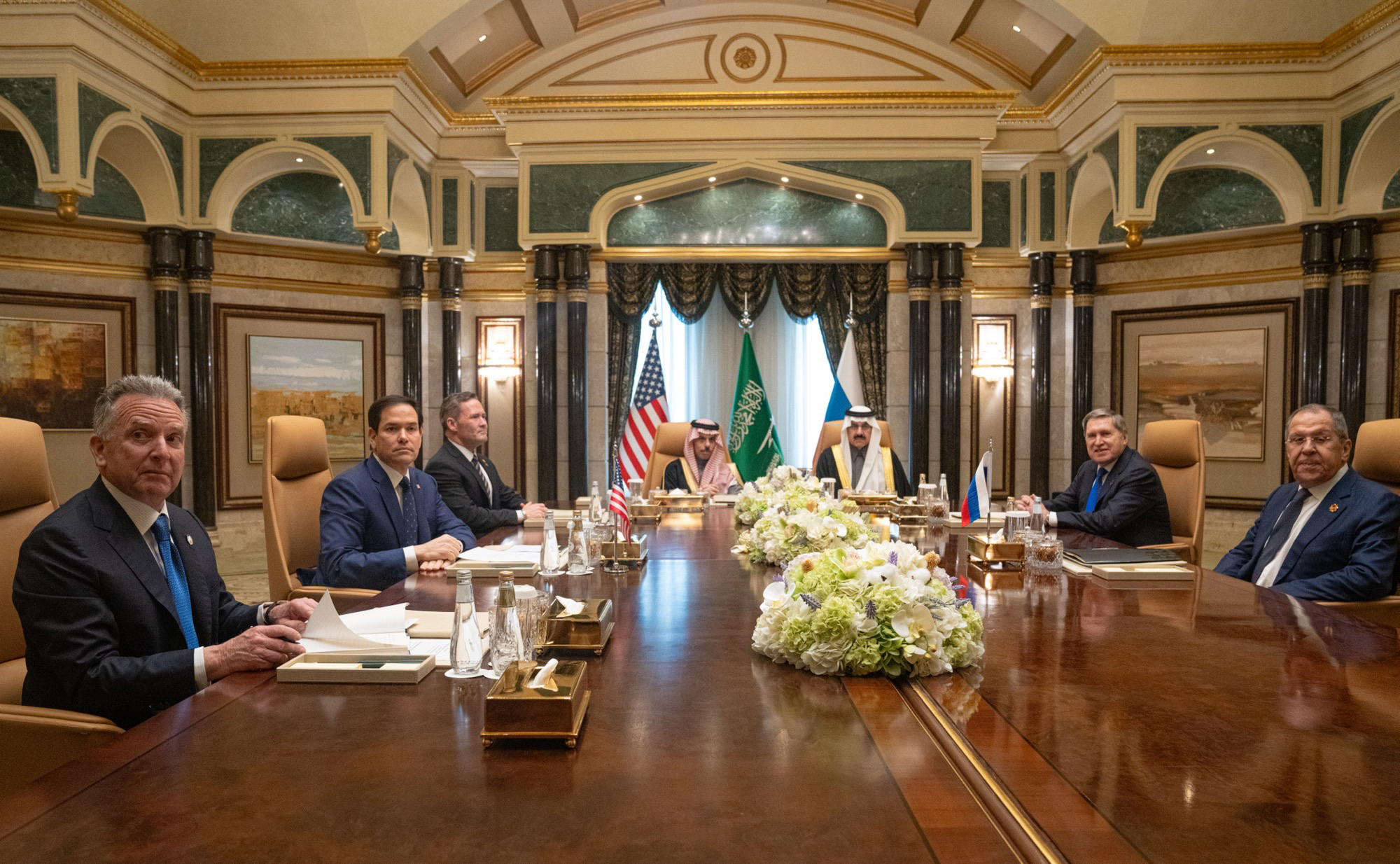
U.S., Saudi, and Russian officials meeting in Riyadh on 18 February 2025

In an interview aired 24 February 2025 (with All-Russia State Television and Radio Broadcasting Company journalist Pavel Zarubin) Putin claimed that Russia and the United States wanted to achieve peace in Ukraine as soon as possible. In Putin's view Ukrainian President Volodymyr Zelenskyy, whom he referred to as "the current head of the regime", stood in the way of peace. He went on to claim that Zelenskyy was "a factor in the disintegration of Ukraine, [Donald] Trump realizes this and wants to revitalize the political environment there, to create conditions for the survival of the Ukrainian state." In the interview Putin stated that Russia is not against the preservation of Ukrainian statehood, but he emphasized that the country should not be used as a "hostile bridgehead"; "So that it eventually becomes a friendly neighboring state." Simultaneously in the interview Putin labelled Russian-occupied territories of Ukraine "the new territories" that he called "our historical territories, which have returned to the Russian Federation." Putin (went on to) claimed that President Zelenskyy was against peace negotiations because this would lead to the lifting of martial law in Ukraine after which Zelenskyy would lose the presidential election to Valerii Zaluzhnyi (whose rating Putin claimed were twice as high as that of Zelenskyy). On 23 February President Zelenskyy had stated in an international news conference in Kyiv: "If to achieve peace you really need me to give up my post – I'm ready." Zelenskyy also claimed "I am not going to be in power for decades." President Zelenskyy also suggested in this news conference that Russian demands for elections in Ukraine, and the claim that he himself was "an illegitimate President", were part of "a sweeping" Russian disinformation campaign. He went on to point out that elections in Ukraine are illegal under martial law and "that it would be impossible for soldiers standing in trenches to take part".

Speaking to widows and mothers of Russian soldiers on 6 March 2025 Putin told them "We must win such a version of peace which would suit us and which ensures calm for our country for a long historical perspective." When an attending mother remarked that Russia "shouldn't give in to anyone", Putin said to her "We are not going to do that." He also told the gathering "We don’t want anything that belongs to others, but we won’t give away anything that belongs to us."

===== 2026 =====
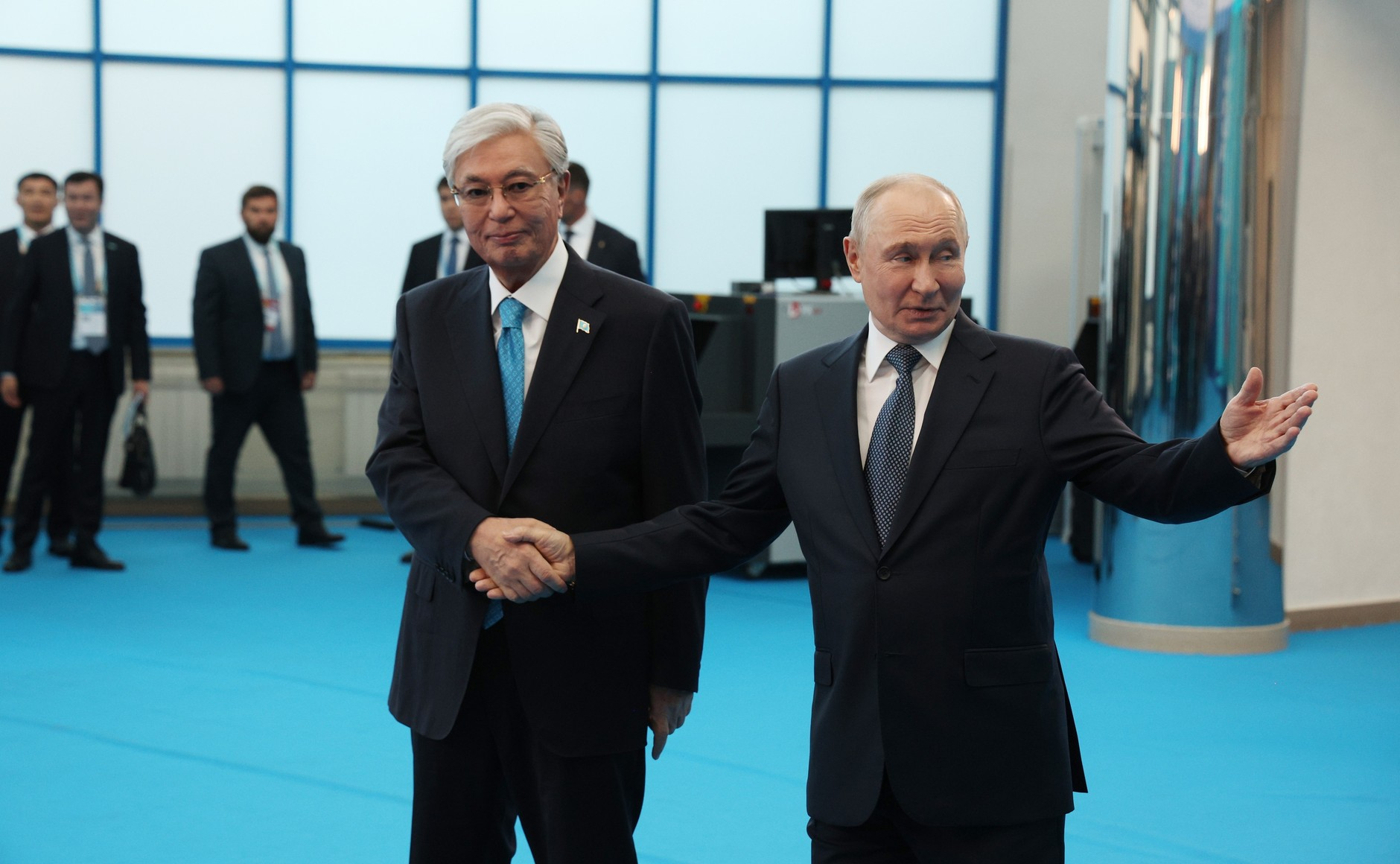
Putin and Kazakh President Kassym-Jomart Tokayev at the 22nd Russia–Kazakhstan Interregional Cooperation Forum in Omsk, 25 July 2026

On 25 July 2026, during a meeting with Putin in Omsk, Russia, Kazakh President Kassym-Jomart Tokayev called for the Russo-Ukrainian war to be “frozen” and for negotiations to resume on the basis of what he described as the “Istanbul Formula 2.0”. Tokayev described the war as an interstate conflict and said that its nature was “not fully understood by many, including ourselves”. He also expressed concern over the continued loss of life, saying that “young people are dying” and that the fighting should be brought to an end. Putin did not publicly respond to Tokayev's proposal during the meeting. Later, Kremlin spokesman Dmitry Peskov rejected a freeze of the conflict, saying it was impossible given Kyiv's position and reiterating Russia's stated objectives as its overriding condition.

== Tensions in other ex-Soviet countries ==
Besides Ukraine, several other ex-Soviet and ex-communist countries continue to be flashpoints in the tug-of-war between the West and Russia. Frozen conflicts in Georgia and Moldova have been major areas of dispute, as both countries have breakaway regions that favor annexation by Russia. The Baltic Sea and other areas have also caused tension between Russia and the West. The annexation of Crimea sparked new worries that Russia might try to further remake the borders of Eastern Europe.

=== Georgia and the Caucasus ===
The Caucasus region

Since the mid-2000s, Georgia has sought closer relations with the West, while Russia has strongly opposed the expansion of Western institutions to its southern border. Georgia has a long connection with the Russian Federation, as it was a republic of the Soviet Union, and became part of the Russian Empire in 1801. In 2003, the Rose Revolution forced Georgian President Eduard Shevardnadze to resign from office. Shevardnadze had been the leader of the Georgian Communist Party when Georgia was one of the republics of the Soviet Union, and Shevardnadze led Georgia for most of its first decade of independence.

Shevardnadze's successor, Mikheil Saakashvili, pursued closer relations with the West. Under President George W. Bush, the United States sought to invite Ukraine and Georgia into NATO. However, Georgia's potential membership in NATO ran into opposition from other NATO members and Russia. Partly in response to the potential expansion of NATO, Russia initiated the 2008 Russo-Georgian diplomatic crisis by lifting CIS sanctions on Abkhazia and South Ossetia. Though considered to be part of Georgia by the United Nations, Abkhazia and South Ossetia have both sought to secede from Georgia since the dissolution of the Soviet Union, and both are strongly supported by Russia.

The Russo-Georgian War broke out in August 2008, as Georgia and Russia competed for influence in South Ossetia. Russia was strongly criticised by many Western countries for its part in the war, and the war heightened tensions between NATO and Russia.

The war ended with a unilateral Russian withdrawal of forces from parts of Georgia, but Russian forces continue to occupy parts of Georgia. In November 2014, a Russian-Abkhazian treaty was met with condemnation from Georgia and many Western countries, who feared that Russia might annex Abkhazia much like it annexed Crimea. Georgia continues to pursue a policy of integration with the West. Georgia holds a strategic position for the European Union, as it gives the EU access to oil in Azerbaijan and Central Asia without having to rely on Russian pipelines.

Besides Georgia, the other two Caucasus states, Armenia and Azerbaijan, have also been a part of the rivalry between Russia and the West. The two countries are long-time rivals, and have a long-running dispute regarding control of Nagorno-Karabakh. Armenia has close ties with Russia, while Azerbaijan has close ties to the United States and Turkey, both of which are members of NATO. However, NATO also ties to Armenia, and both Armenia and Azerbaijan have been speculated as potential future members of NATO. Armenia negotiated an Association Agreement with the European Union but, similar to Ukraine, Armenia chose to reject the deal in 2013. The next year, Armenia voted to join the Eurasian Economic Union, the Russian-backed free trade zone that seeks to rival the European Union. However, Armenian leaders have also worked towards a free trade agreement with the EU.

=== Moldova ===
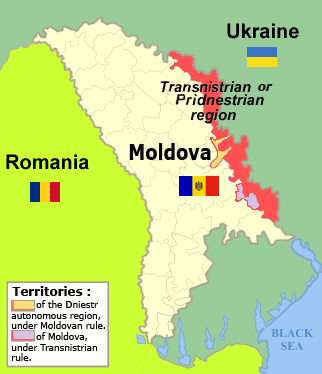
Transnistria is a breakaway territory in Moldova.

Much like Ukraine, Moldova has experienced internal debates between those favoring closer ties to the West (including joining the European Union) and those favoring closer ties to Russia (including joining the Russian-backed Eurasian Union). Also like Ukraine, Moldova was a part of the Soviet Union; though Moldova was a part of Romania prior to World War II, it was annexed into the Soviet Union in 1940. In May 2014, Moldova signed a major trade deal with the European Union, causing Russia to apply pressure on the Moldovan economy, which relies heavily on remittances from Russia.

The 2014 Moldovan parliamentary elections saw a victory for an alliance of pro-Western integration parties. Moldova is also home to a breakaway region, known as Transnistria, which forms the Community for Democracy and Rights of Nations along with Abkhazia, South Ossetia, and Nagorno-Karabakh. In 2014, Transnistria held a referendum in which it voted to join the Eurasian Economic Union, and Russia has strong influence over the region. A build-up of Russian forces on the Ukrainian-Russian border caused NATO commander Philip Breedlove to speculate that the Russian Federation might attempt to attack Moldova and occupy Transnistria.

=== Baltic states and Scandinavia ===
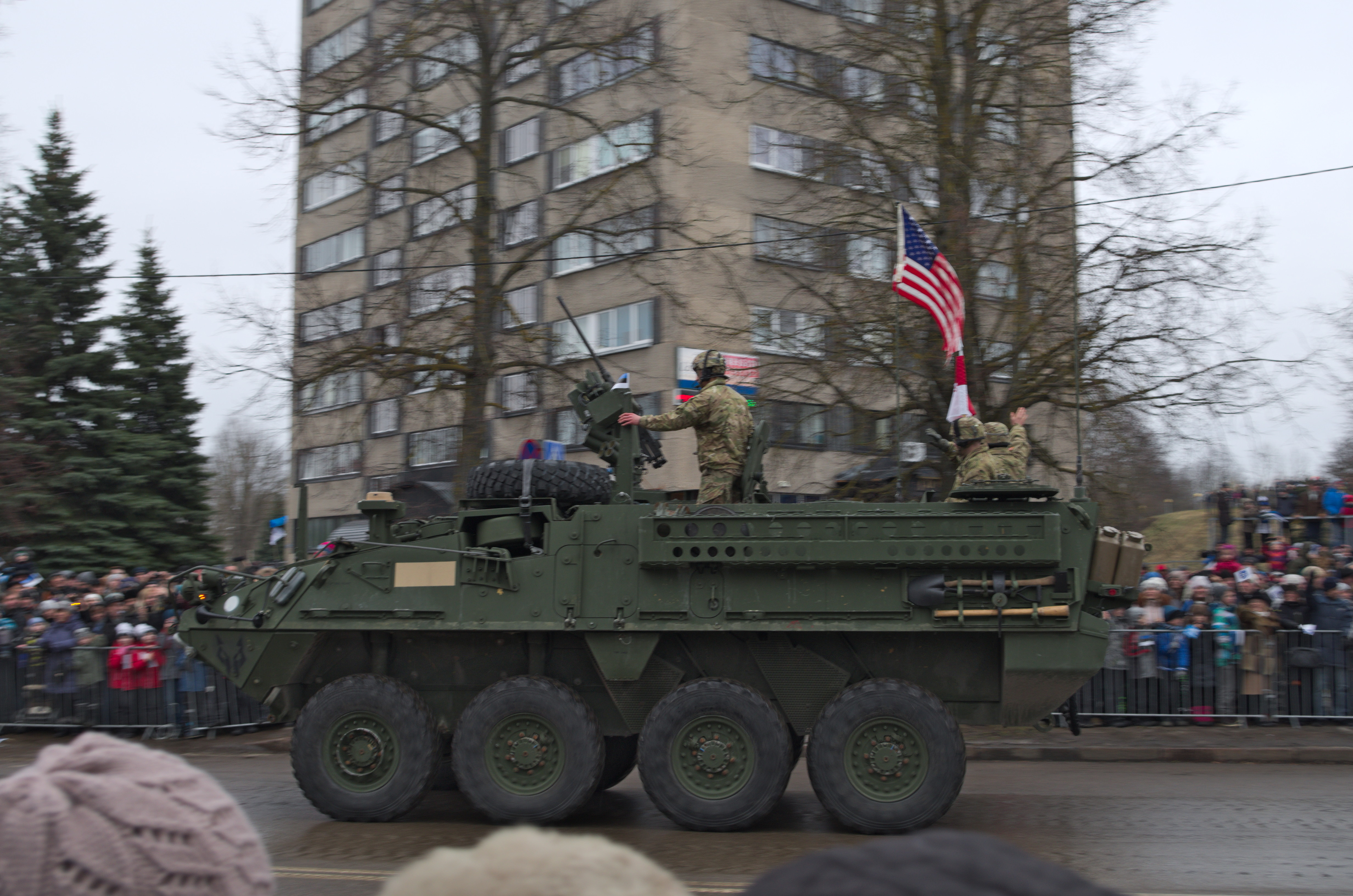
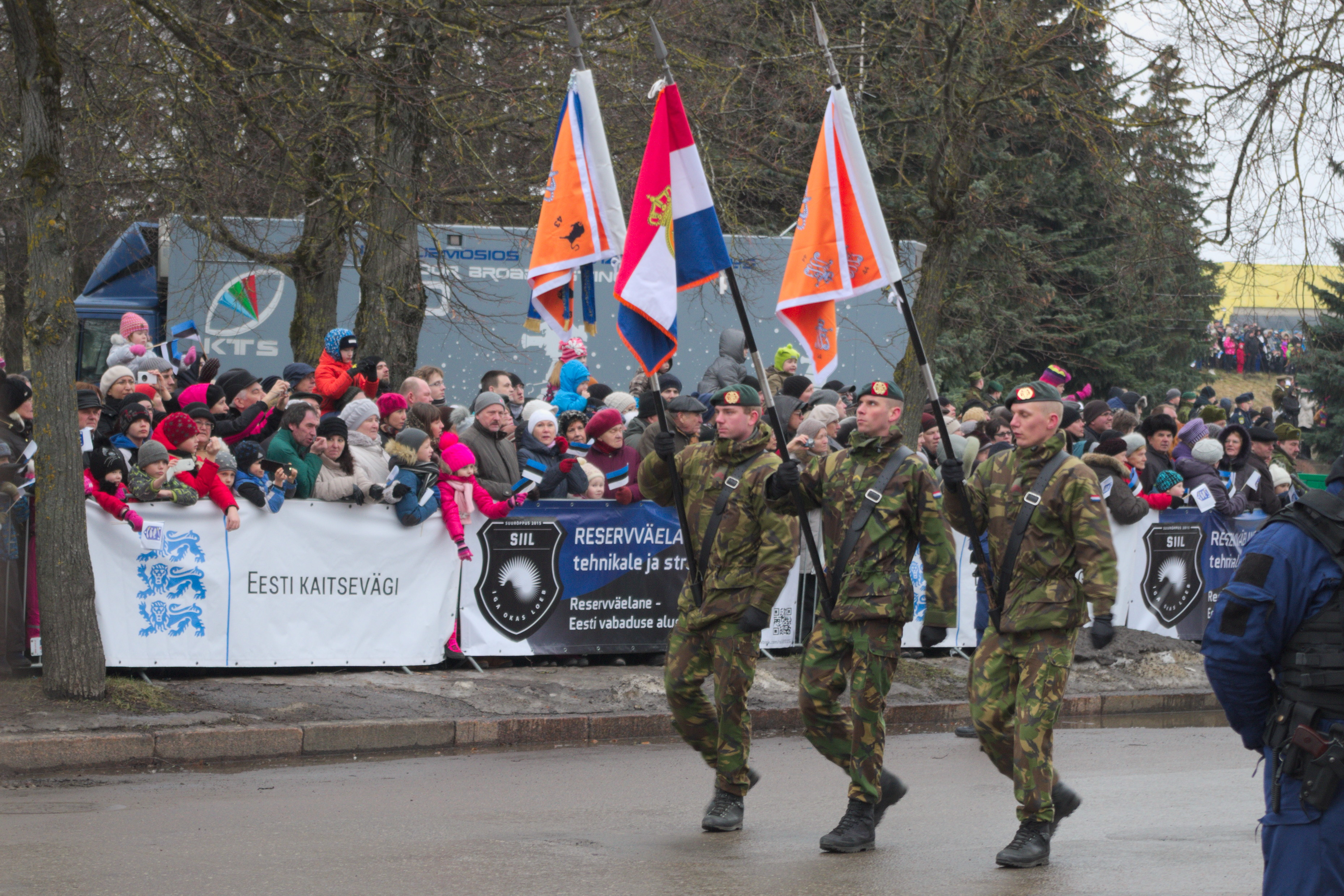
A NATO military parade was held on Estonian independence day in the town of Narva, metres from the border with Russia, as a response to events in Ukraine. Estonian, Lithuanian, Latvian, Spanish, Dutch, British and American military personnel and their vehicles took part in the ceremony.

The Baltic states of Estonia, Lithuania, and Latvia—all three of which are members of NATO—have warily watched Russian military movements and actions. All three countries, within the Russian Empire prior to 1918, had been annexed by the Soviet Union in 1940 as part of the Molotov–Ribbentrop Pact, and Russian leaders were particularly distressed by their accession to NATO and the EU in 2004. In 2014, the Baltic states reported several incursions into their air space by Russian military aircraft.

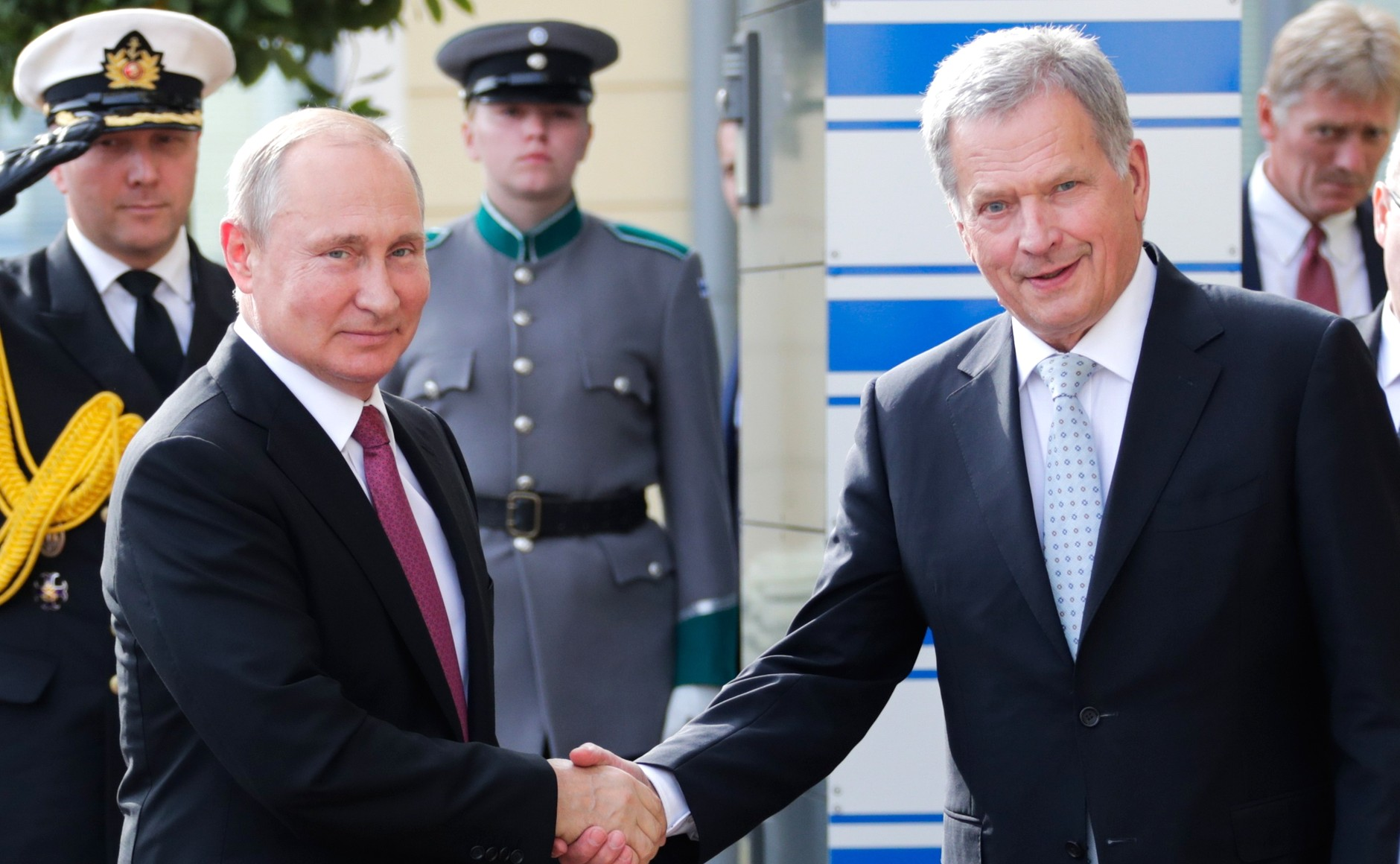
Putin with Finnish President Sauli Niinistö in Helsinki, 21 August 2019

Tensions rose as Russian intelligence forces crossed the Estonian border and captured Estonian Internal Security Service officer Eston Kohver. In October 2014, Sweden engaged in a hunt for a foreign submarine that had entered its waters; suspicions that the submarine was Russian have caused further alarm in the Baltic states. However, the Swedish Armed Forces later admitted that the alleged sighting of a Russian sub was actually just a "workboat". The tensions in the Baltic and other areas have led neighboring Sweden and Finland, both of which have long been neutral states, to openly discuss joining NATO. Due to the Russian invasion, both Sweden and Finland began the process of negotiating to join NATO.

In early April 2015, British press publications, with a reference to semi-official sources within the Russian military and intelligence establishment, suggested that Russia was ready to use any means—including nuclear weapons—to forestall NATO moving more forces into the Baltic states.

== Relations with Australia, Latin America, and others ==
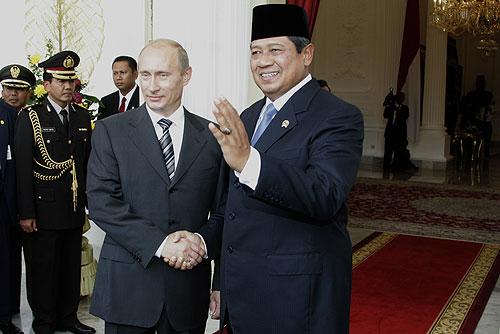
Putin in Indonesia meeting President Susilo Bambang Yudhoyono to sign a defense deal

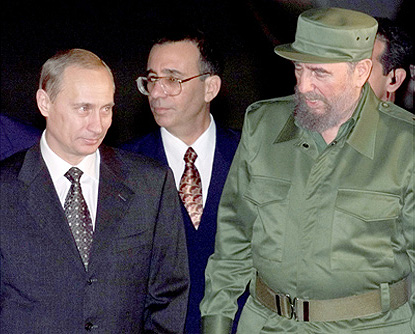
Putin with Fidel Castro in 2000

Putin and his successor Medvedev have enjoyed warm relations with Hugo Chávez of Venezuela. Much of this has been through the sale of military equipment; since 2005, Venezuela has purchased more than $4 billion worth of arms from Russia. In September 2008, Russia sent Tupolev Tu-160 bombers to Venezuela to carry out training flights. In December 2008, both countries held a joint naval exercise in the Caribbean Sea. Earlier in 2000, Putin had re-established stronger ties with Fidel Castro's Cuba. Putin continued good relations with Venezuela under the successor of Chávez, Nicolas Maduro, supporting him after NATO and the European Union broke off ties with Venezuela due to claims of fraud in the 2018 presidential elections. In December 2018, Russia and Venezuela once again conducted joint military exercises and in 2020, CNBC stated that Russia was Venezuela's primary geopolitical ally.

In 2022, both Cuba and Venezuela expressed support for the Russian invasion of Ukraine.

In September 2007, Putin visited Indonesia and in doing so became the first Russian leader to visit the country in more than 50 years. In the same month, Putin also attended the APEC meeting held in Sydney, Australia where he met with Australian Prime Minister John Howard and signed a uranium trade deal. This was the first visit by a Russian president to Australia.

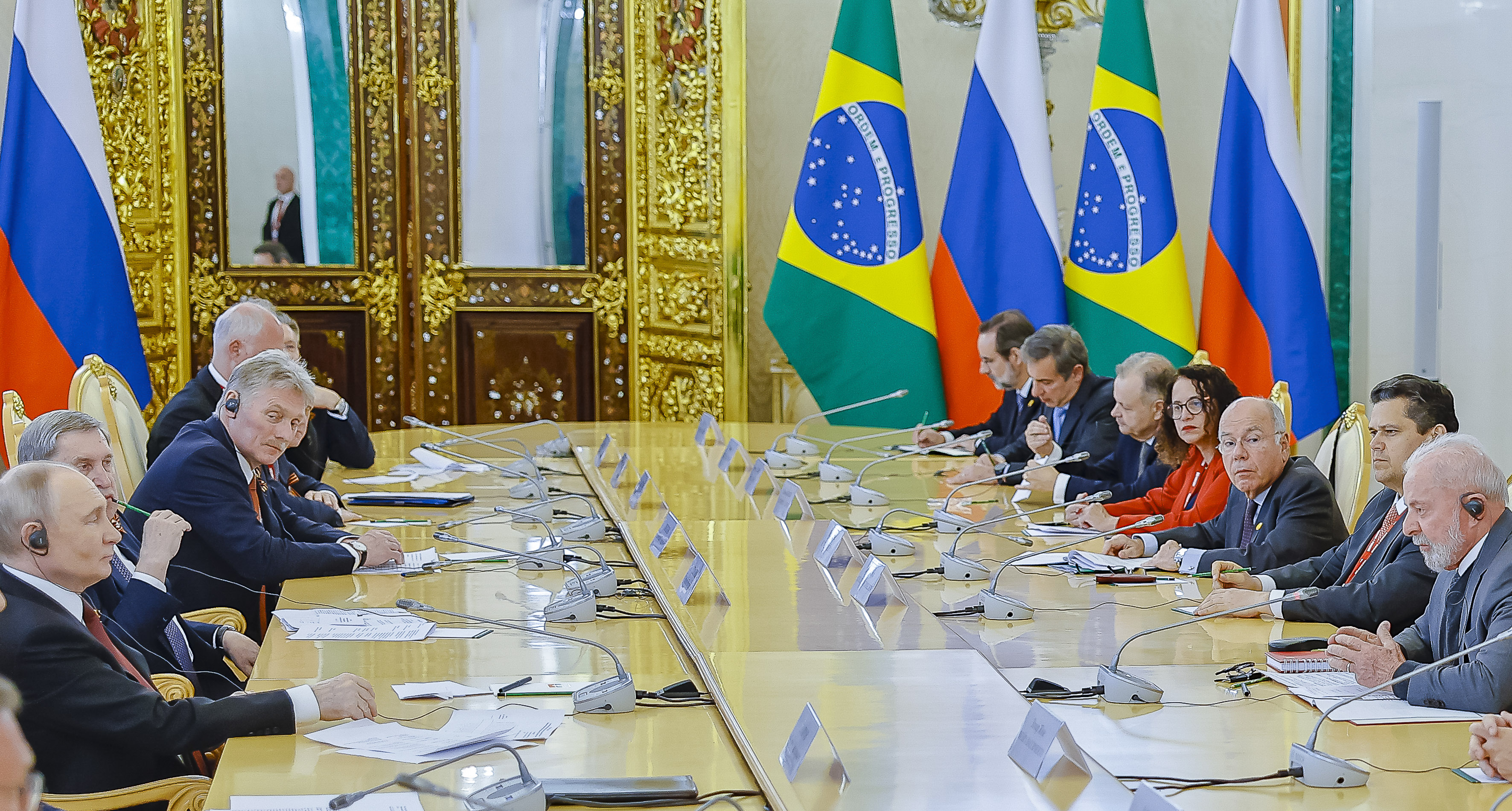
Putin and Brazilian President Lula da Silva in Moscow on 9 May 2025

In May 2025, Brazilian President Luiz Inácio Lula da Silva visited Moscow to attend the Victory Day parade and met with Vladimir Putin. Lula called for strengthening the countries' strategic partnership and expanding bilateral cooperation, including in energy, science and technology.

== Energy policy ==
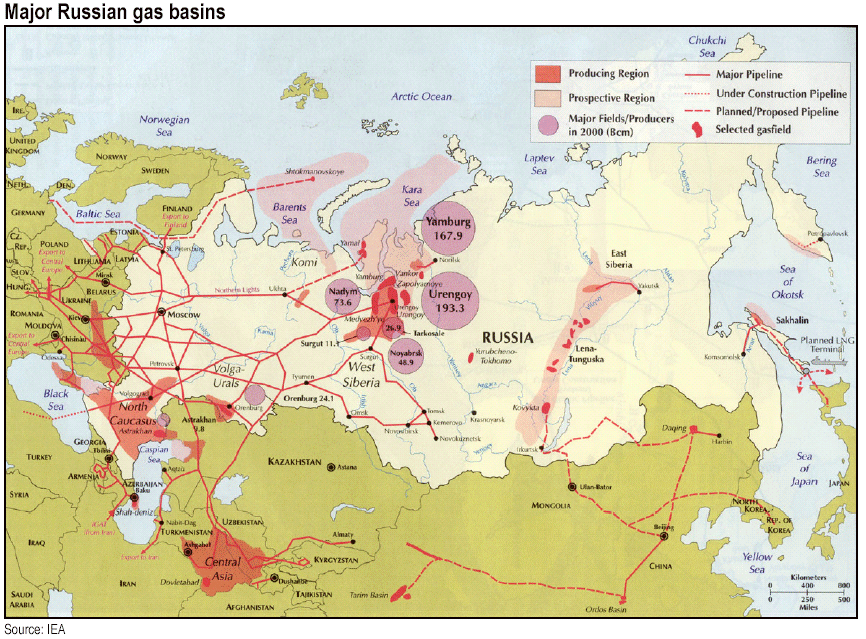
Major Russian natural gas basins circa 2000

The Russian economy is heavily dependent on the export of natural resources such as oil and natural gas, and Russia has used these resources to its political advantage. Meanwhile, the US and other Western countries have worked to lessen the dependency of Europe on Russia and its resources.

Starting in the mid-2000s, Russia and Ukraine had several disputes in which Russia threatened to cut off the supply of gas. As a great deal of Russia's gas is exported to Europe through the pipelines crossing Ukraine, those disputes affected several other European countries. Under Putin, special efforts were made to gain control over the European energy sector.

Russian influence played a major role in canceling the construction of the Nabucco pipeline, which would have supplied natural gas from Azerbaijan, in favor of South Stream (though South Stream itself was also later canceled). Russia has also sought to create a Eurasian Economic Union consisting of itself and other post-Soviet countries.

Like many other countries, Russia's economy suffered during the Great Recession. Following the annexation of Crimea by the Russian Federation, several countries (including most of NATO) imposed sanctions on Russia, hurting the Russian economy by cutting off access to capital. At the same time, the global price of oil declined. The combination of international sanctions and the falling crude price in 2014 and thereafter resulted in the ongoing 2014–15 Russian financial crisis. As a way to get around sanctions, Russia and China signed a 150 billion yuan central bank liquidity swap line agreement to get around American sanctions and agreed to a US$400 billion deal which would supply natural gas to China over the next 30 years.

== Notable foreign policy speeches by President Vladimir Putin ==
- Munich speech of Vladimir Putin on 10 February 2007
- Crimean speech of Vladimir Putin on 18 March 2014
- Valdai speech of Vladimir Putin on 24 October 2014
- Crimean speech on 4 December 2014
- U.N. General Assembly speech on 28 September 2015

== See also ==
- List of international presidential trips made by Vladimir Putin
- Second Cold War
- Foreign relations of Russia
- Foundations of Geopolitics
- International relations since 1989
- Russia–United States relations
- China–Russia relations
- Brezhnev Doctrine
