= Public image of Vladimir Putin =

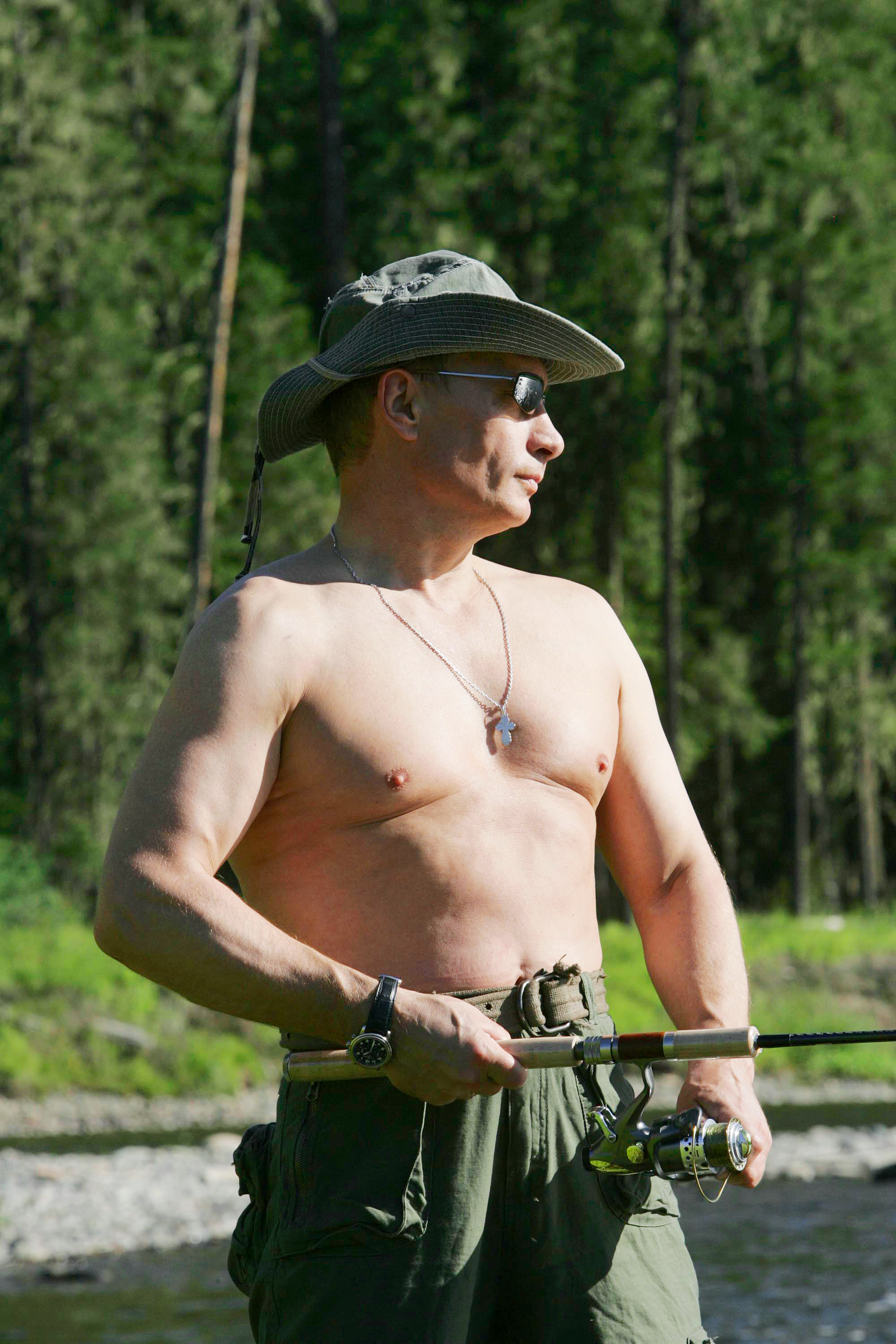
Putin in Tuva, age 55, displaying his physique while fishing in 2007; picture from the official Russian President website. Putin often presents a macho image in the media.

Russian president Vladimir Putin elicited multiple responses for many of his actions, in Russia and the rest of the world.

According to the Russian non-governmental organization Levada Center, about 85% of the Russian population approved of Putin in the beginning of 2023, the highest in nearly 8 years.

== Public opinion ==
=== Domestic ===
According to public opinion surveys conducted by NGO Levada Center, Putin's approval rating was 60% in July 2020. Putin's popularity rose from 31% in August 1999 to 80% in November 1999, never dropping below 65% during his first presidency. Observers see Putin's high approval ratings as a consequence of the significant improvements in living standards and Russia's reassertion of itself on the world scene that has occurred during his period of office. One analysis attributed Putin's popularity, in part, to state-owned or state-controlled television.

A joint poll by World Public Opinion in the US and Levada Center in Russia around June–July 2006 stated that "neither the Russian nor the American publics are convinced Russia is headed in an anti-democratic direction" and "Russians generally support Putin's concentration of political power and strongly support the re-nationalization of Russia's oil and gas industry." Russians generally support the political course of Putin and his team. A 2005 survey showed that three times as many Russians felt the country was "more democratic" under Putin than it was during the Yeltsin or Gorbachev years, and the same proportion thought human rights were better under Putin than Yeltsin.

In a June 2007 public opinion survey, Putin's approval rating was 81%, the second-highest of any leader in the world that year. In January 2013, at the time of the 2011–2013 Russian protests, Putin's rating fell to 62%, the lowest since 2000. In a context of increased diplomatic isolation and international sanctions on Russian officials prompted by the Russo-Ukrainian war, Putin's approval rating reached 87% in August 2014. In February 2015, based on domestic polling, Putin was ranked the world's most popular politician. In June 2015, Putin's approval rating climbed to 89%, an all-time high. Observers saw Putin's high approval ratings in 2010s as a consequence of improvements in living standards, and Russia's reassertion on the world scene during his presidency.

In January 2013, at the time of 2011–2013 Russian protests, Putin's approval rating fell to 62%, the lowest figure since 2000 and a ten-point drop over two years. By May 2014, following the annexation of Crimea, Putin's approval rating had rebounded to 85.9%, a six-year high.

After EU and U.S. sanctions against Russian officials as a result of the 2014 Russian invasion of Ukraine, Putin's approval rating reached 87 percent, according to a Levada Center survey published on 6 August 2014. In February 2015, based on new domestic polling, Putin was ranked the world's most popular politician. In June 2015, Putin's approval rating climbed to 89%, an all-time high. In 2016, the approval rating was 81%.

Despite high approval for Putin, confidence in the Russian economy is low, dropping to levels in 2016 that rivaled the recent lows in 2009 at the height of the global economic crisis. Just 14% of Russians in 2016 said their national economy was getting better, and 18% said this about their local economies. Putin's performance at reining in corruption is also unpopular among Russians. Newsweek reported in June 2017 that "An opinion poll by the Moscow-based Levada Center indicated that 67 percent held Putin personally responsible for high-level corruption".

In July 2018, Putin's approval rating fell to 63% and just 49% would vote for Putin if presidential elections were held. Levada poll results published in September 2018 showed Putin's personal trustworthiness levels at 39% (decline from 59% in November 2017) with the main contributing factor being the presidential support of the unpopular pension reform and economic stagnation. In October 2018, two thirds of Russians surveyed in Levada poll agreed that "Putin bears full responsibility for the problems of the country", which has been attributed to decline of a popular belief in "good tsar and bad boyars", a traditional attitude towards justifying failures of the ruling hierarchy in Russia.

In January 2019, the percentage of Russians trusting Putin hit a then-historic low—33%. In April 2019 Gallup poll showed a record number of Russians, 20%, willing to permanently emigrate from Russia. The decline was even larger in the 17–25 age group, "who find themselves largely disconnected from the country's aging leadership, nostalgic Soviet rhetoric and nepotistic agenda". Putin's approval rating among young Russians was 32% in January 2019. The percentage willing to emigrate permanently in this group was 41%. 60% had favorable views of the US (three times more than in the 55+ age group). Decline in support for the president and government is visible in other polls, such as a rapidly growing readiness to protest against poor living conditions.

In May 2020, Putin's approval rating dropped to a historic low of 59% in an April poll by the Levada Center. In May 2021, 33% indicated Putin in response to "who would you vote for this weekend?" among Moscow respondents and 40% outside Moscow. A survey released in October 2021 found 53% of respondents saying they trusted Putin. Observers see a generational struggle among Russians over perception of Putin's rule, with younger Russians more probably to be against Putin and older Russians more likely to accept the narrative presented by state-controlled media in Russia. Putin's support among Russians aged 18–24 was only 20% in December 2020. In December 2021, a Levada Center poll found that 65% approved of Putin personally, that jumped to 69% who had a positive view of Putin in January 2022, and 71% who approved of the Russian president in February 2022 (before the 2022 Russian invasion of Ukraine).

Following the Russian invasion of Ukraine in 2022, state-controlled TV, where most Russians get their news, presented the invasion as a "special military operation" and liberation mission, in line with the government's narrative. The Russian censorship apparatus Roskomnadzor ordered the country's media to employ information only from state sources or face fines and blocks. The Russian media was banned from using the words "war", "invasion" or "aggression" to describe the invasion, with media outlets being blocked as a result.

In late February 2022, a survey conducted by the independent research group Russian Field found that 59% of respondents supported the "special military operation" in Ukraine. According to the poll, in the group of 18-to-24-year-olds, only 29% supported the "special military operation". In late February and mid-March 2022 two polls surveyed Russians' sentiments about the "special military operation" in Ukraine. The results were obtained by Radio Liberty. 71% of Russians polled said that they supported the "special military operation" in Ukraine.

When asked how they were affected by the actions of Putin, a third said they strongly believed Putin was working in their interests. Another 26% said he was working in their interests to some extent. In general, most Russians believe that it would be better if Putin remained president for as long as possible. Similarly, a survey conducted in early March found 58% of Russian respondents approved of the operation.

A poll published on 30 March in Russia saw Putin's approval rating jump, from 71% in February, to 83%. However, experts warned that the figures may not accurately reflect the public mood, as the public tends to rally around leaders during war and some may be hiding their true opinions, especially with the Russian 2022 war censorship laws prohibiting dissemination of "fake information" about the military. Many respondents do not want to answer pollsters' questions for fear of negative consequences. When researchers commissioned a survey on Russians' attitudes to the war, 29,400 out of 31,000 refused to answer. The Levada Center's director stated that early feelings of "shock and confusion" were being replaced with the belief that Russia was being besieged and that Russians must rally around their leader. The Kremlin's analysis concluded that public support for the war was broad but not deep, and that most Russians would accept anything Putin labeled a victory. In September 2023, the head of the VTsIOM state pollster Valery Fyodorov said in an interview that only 10–15% of Russians actively supported the war, and that "most Russians are not demanding the conquest of Kyiv or Odesa".

A poll by the independent organization Levada, which was conducted on 22–28 June 2023, showed that 42% of respondents would vote for Putin in the 2024 presidential election. A public opinion poll by the state-owned institution VCIOM, which was conducted in November 2023, found that 37.3% of respondents would vote for Putin. According to a VCIOM poll conducted in early March 2024, 56.2% of respondents would vote for Putin.

=== International ===
According to polling by Gallup International and Pew Research Center, Putin's international reputation fell dramatically after the 2022 invasion of Ukraine. In Spring 2022, Pew found that international approval for Putin had declined to record lows following the invasion. According to polling by Gallup, Putin's global average net favorability fell from +3 in 2017 to -41 in 2025.

A 2017 WIN/GIA poll of 61 countries found that Putin was popular in most world regions outside Europe and North America, particularly in countries such as Serbia, Vietnam, India and Iran. It found that the global average share with a favorable view of Putin increased from 33% in 2015 to 43% in 2017, while the share with an unfavorable view in 2017 was 40%. By 2025, Gallup found that Putin's favorability had declined significantly to become net unfavorable in all regions outside South Asia. It also fell in Serbia (by 31 points), India (-19) and Iran (-56). The largest falls were in Croatia (-84), Greece (-79), Moldova (-76) and Armenia (-75).

A 2023 poll by Pew Research Center in 24 countries showed that 87% of respondents felt distrustful of Putin, with only 11% feeling confident in Putin. 82% of respondents have negative views of Russia. In Romania, in a 2022 poll, only 3% of Romanians had a positive opinion of Putin while 70% of Romanians had a negative one. In March 2022, 97% of Ukrainians said they had an unfavorable view of Putin, and 98% of Ukrainians—including 82% of ethnic Russians living in Ukraine—said they did not believe any part of Ukraine was rightfully part of Russia.

International views of Vladimir Putin (2025)
Country polled	Favorable	Unfavorable	Net Score	2017 Net Score	Delta
Global average	25%	66%	-41	+3	-44
Ukraine	0%	98%	-98	-24	-74
Denmark	1%	96%	-94	-	-
Sweden	2%	96%	-94	-61	-33
Norway	4%	94%	-90	-	-
Estonia	4%	92%	-88	-	-
Finland	5%	93%	-87	-	-
South Korea	5%	91%	-86	-51	-35
Poland	6%	89%	-83	-76	-7
Netherlands	6%	86%	-80	-65	-15
Spain	8%	87%	-79	-53	-26
Switzerland	8%	87%	-79	-	-
Germany	8%	86%	-78	-54	-24
Kosovo	9%	85%	-75	-49	-26
Lithuania	9%	84%	-75	-	-
Ireland	10%	84%	-74	-55	-19
Japan	6%	80%	-74	-53	-21
Belgium	10%	83%	-73	-	-
Portugal	13%	83%	-70	-	-
Austria	13%	80%	-68	-31	-37
Croatia	13%	79%	-66	+18	-84
Georgia	14%	78%	-64	-	-
France	15%	73%	-59	-46	-13
Australia	20%	73%	-54	-43	-11
Latvia	16%	69%	-53	-19	-34
Czech Republic	20%	71%	-51	-52	+1
United States	18%	69%	-50	-52	+2
Italy	20%	69%	-49	-17	-32
Slovenia	23%	71%	-48	-10	-38
United Kingdom	22%	69%	-48	-56	+8
Ghana	24%	67%	-44	+12	-56
Syria	28%	71%	-43	-	-
Argentina	23%	61%	-38	+4	-42
Hungary	29%	63%	-34	-	-
Greece	33%	65%	-32	+47	-79
Romania	30%	60%	-30	+37	-67
Slovakia	30%	57%	-27	-	-
Colombia	28%	51%	-23	+8	-31
Bulgaria	27%	45%	-18	+25	-43
Moldova	33%	50%	-17	+59	-76
Turkey	25%	42%	-17	+19	-36
Bosnia and Herzegovina	39%	53%	-14	+13	-27
North Macedonia	41%	54%	-14	+15	-29
Philippines	34%	48%	-14	+20	-34
Iran	42%	54%	-11	+45	-56
Iraq	44%	55%	-10	+45	-55
Indonesia	30%	30%	+1	+22	-21
Peru	40%	35%	+5	+19	-14
Armenia	52%	46%	+6	+81	-75
Ecuador	48%	42%	+7	+2	+5
Kenya	51%	43%	+7	-	-
Thailand	52%	45%	+7	+25	-18
Mexico	50%	42%	+8	+18	-10
South Africa	53%	44%	+9	-6	+15
Malaysia	49%	36%	+12	-	-
Pakistan	39%	24%	+15	+8	+7
Azerbaijan	55%	36%	+19	-7	+26
India	62%	32%	+30	+49	-19
Serbia	67%	29%	+37	+68	-31

== Assessments ==
Putin was Time magazine's Person of the Year for 2007; these selections are based on the person or persons "who most affected the news and our lives, for good or ill". In April 2008, Putin was put on the Time 100 most influential people in the world list. Criticism of Putin has been widespread especially over the Runet. It is said that the Russian youth organisations finance a full "network" of pro-government bloggers. On 4 December 2007, at Harvard University, former Soviet leader Mikhail Gorbachev credited Putin with having "pulled Russia out of chaos" and said he was "assured a place in history", although he also maintained that the media had been suppressed and that the electoral regulations in modern Russia ran counter to the democratic ideals he promoted. In December 2011, amid the protests following the 2011 Russian elections Gorbachev criticized Putin for a decision to seek the third term in the presidential elections and advised Putin to leave politics.

Romanian-French writer and philosopher Jean Parvulesco described Putin as "a terrestrial representation of Christ Pantocrator, preparing the advent of the Eurasian Empire of the End".

In the U.S. embassy cables leaked in late 2010, Putin was called "alpha dog" and compared with Batman (while Dmitry Medvedev was compared with Batman's crime-fighting partner Robin). American diplomats said Putin's Russia had become "a corrupt, autocratic kleptocracy centred on the leadership of Putin, in which officials, oligarchs and organised crime are bound together to create a "virtual mafia state." Putin called it "slanderous".

By western commentators and the Russian opposition, Putin has been described as a dictator. Putin biographer Masha Gessen has stated that "Putin is a dictator," comparing him to Alexander Lukashenko. Former UK Foreign Secretary David Miliband has described Putin as a "ruthless dictator" whose "days are numbered." In the 2012 United States presidential election, U.S. presidential candidate Mitt Romney called Putin "a real threat to the stability and peace of the world."

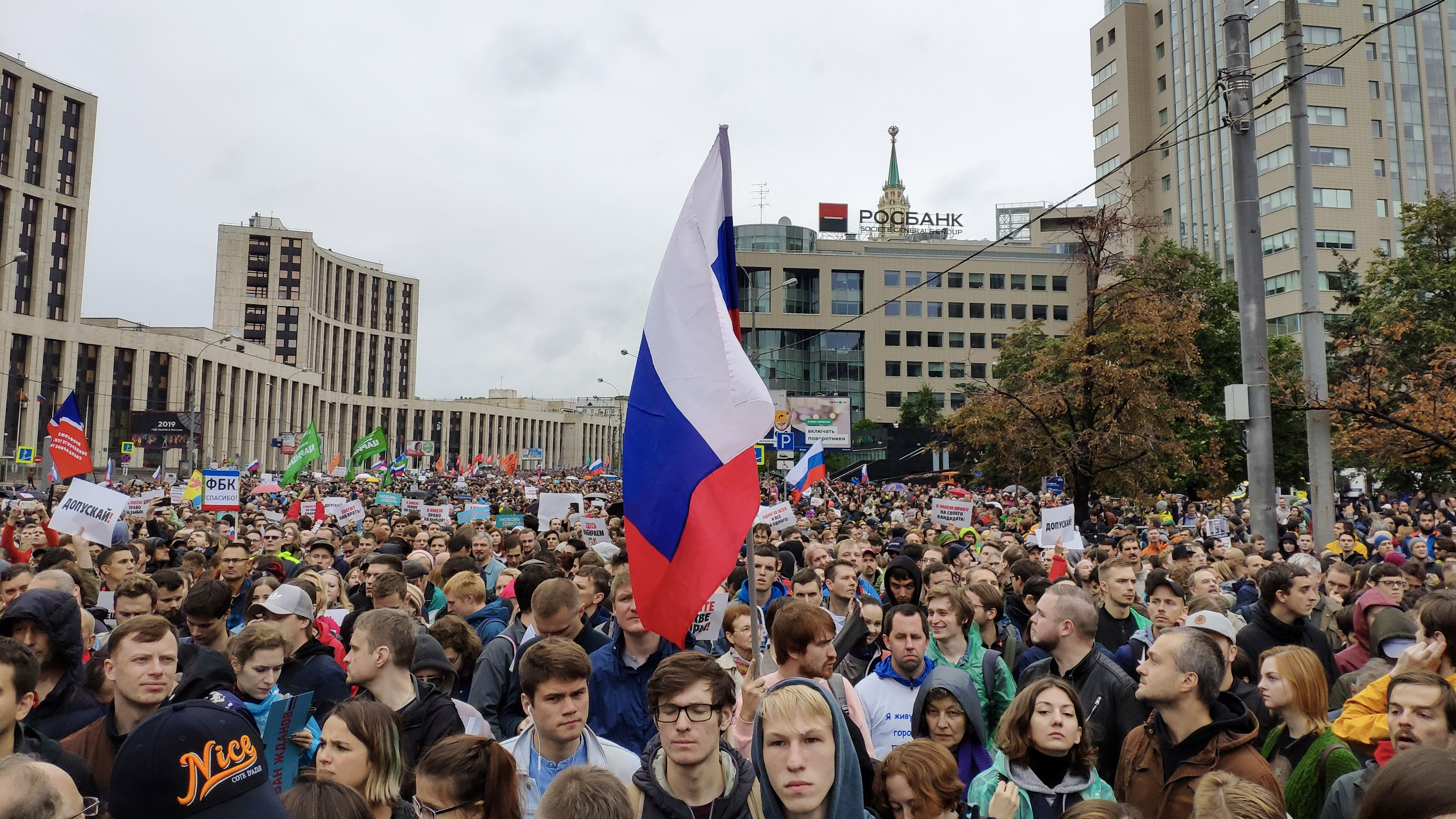
Moscow rally in support of opposition candidates for the Moscow City Duma, 10 August 2019

In early September 2014 Patriarch Filaret, head of the Ukrainian Orthodox Church of the Kyivan Patriarchate, linked Putin with the biblical figure Cain because Filaret believed that although Putin claimed to be their "brother", he was responsible for "shedding the brotherly blood" of Ukrainians during the War in Donbas. Filaret believed "Satan went into him, as into Judas Iscariot". The Dalai Lama criticized Putin's foreign policy practices, claiming it to be responsible for isolating Russia from the rest of the world. The Organized Crime and Corruption Reporting Project named Putin as the 2014 Person of the Year, recognizing "the person who does the most to enable and promote organized criminal activity."

According to Denis Volkov from Moscow Levada Center, drawing any conclusions from Russian poll results or comparing them with Western polls is pointless as there's no real political competition in Russia. Unlike in democratic states, the Russian voters aren't offered any "credible alternatives" and the public opinion is formed primarily with state-controlled media which promotes the ruling party and discredits any alternative candidates. This kind of illusion of democracy, choice only between "A and A", is part of "Russian consciousness", according to a nationalist writer Alexander Prokhanov, who considers the "elections between A and B" to be part of a "liberal" mindset.

== Brands ==
Putin's name and image are widely used in advertisements and product branding. Among Putin-branded products are Putinka vodka, the PuTin brand of tinned food, Gorbusha Putina caviar, and a collection of T-shirts with his image. In October 2016, the luxury company, Caviar, produced a limited series of iPhone 7s made from Damascus steel called Supremo Putin Damascus. It features a golden bas-relief portrait of Putin. Putin Huylo (also spelled Putin Huilo) is a beer that is made by Pravda beer brewery in Lviv, Ukraine and also by several other breweries around the world.

== Physical condition ==
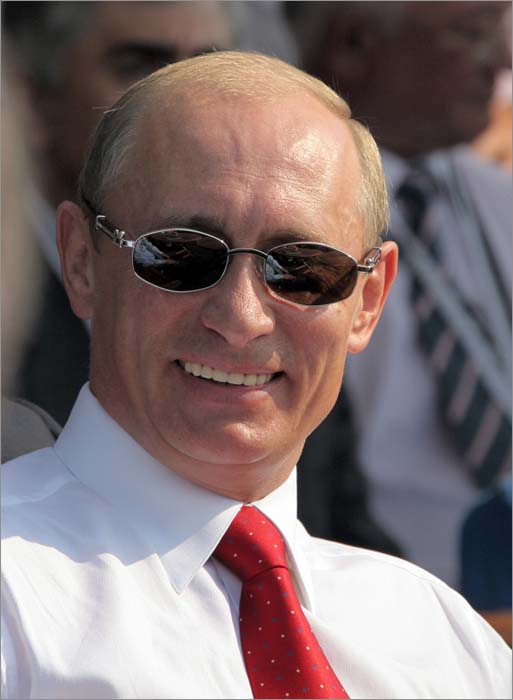
A picture of Putin smiling at a camera during the MAKS airshow, 2007

Putin has created a cult of personality for himself as an outdoorsy, sporty, tough guy public image, demonstrating his physical capabilities and taking part in unusual or dangerous acts, such as extreme sports and interaction with wild animals. For example, in 2007, the tabloid Komsomolskaya Pravda published a huge photograph of a bare-chested Putin vacationing in the Siberian mountains under the headline: "Be Like Putin." Such photo ops are part of a public relations approach that, according to Wired, "deliberately cultivates the macho, take-charge superhero image". The British tabloid Daily Express has commented that this cultivated image runs counter to the reality of Putin's modest physical stature, his height being officially reported as 170 cm (5 ft 7 in), and some of the activities used to promote his virile prowess have been criticized for involving deception or being completely staged. Notable examples of Putin's macho adventures include:

- Putin flew in a Sukhoi Su-27 fighter over Chechnya in 2000 and a Tu-160 supersonic heavy bomber on 16 August 2005 at MAKS Airshow.
- Martial arts – Putin demonstrated his martial art skills on a tatami at the Kodokan Institute in Tokyo on 5 September 2000 and has subsequently made further demonstrations. Putin currently holds a black belt in Judo. Putin had also been awarded an honorary 9th Dan belt in Taekwondo before it was rescinded in February 2022.
- Adventures in the wild – On his trip to Tuva in August 2007, Putin was seen riding horses, rafting, fishing and swimming in a cold Siberian river (mostly bare-chested). In August 2009, Putin repeated the experience. In 2008, Putin visited the Ussuri national park, where he sedated an Amur tiger with a tranquiliser gun and then helped measure its teeth and fit it with a tracker. Claims were made later that the tiger was actually from the Khabarovsk Zoo and that it died soon after the stunt, but the suspected tiger named by the Khabarovsk Zoo workers was found in late 2009 in Zelenogorsk, while the claims of a stunt were denied by the scientists who organized the "safari". In April 2010, Putin traveled to Franz Josef Land in the Russian Arctic, where he tranquilized a polar bear and attached a satellite tag to it. In late August 2010, Putin shot darts from a crossbow at a gray whale off Kamchatka Peninsula coast as part of an eco-tracking effort, while balancing on a rubber boat in the sea.
- Descending in a deepwater submersible – On 1 August 2009, Putin descended 1395 m to the bottom of Lake Baikal, the world's deepest lake, on a MIR submersible accompanied by deepwater explorer Anatoly Sagalevich (who had been among the team which had reached the bottom at the North Pole in the Arktika 2007 expedition). From the bottom of Baikal Putin spoke to journalists via hydrophone.
- Riding a motorbike – In July 2010, Putin appeared at a bikers festival in Sevastopol riding a Harley-Davidson tricycle; the high council of Russian bikers movements unanimously voted him into a Hells Angel rank with the nickname of Abaddon. Putin's associations with motorcycle gangs led to him being accidentally placed on a blacklist of banned people in Finland. In August 2011 a video showed Putin riding with the Night Wolves who were later sanctioned by the United States, EU, and Canada.
- Firefighting from the air – In August 2010, Russian TV broadcast a video of Putin co-piloting a firefighting plane Beriev Be-200 to dump water on a raging fire during the 2010 Russian wildfires.

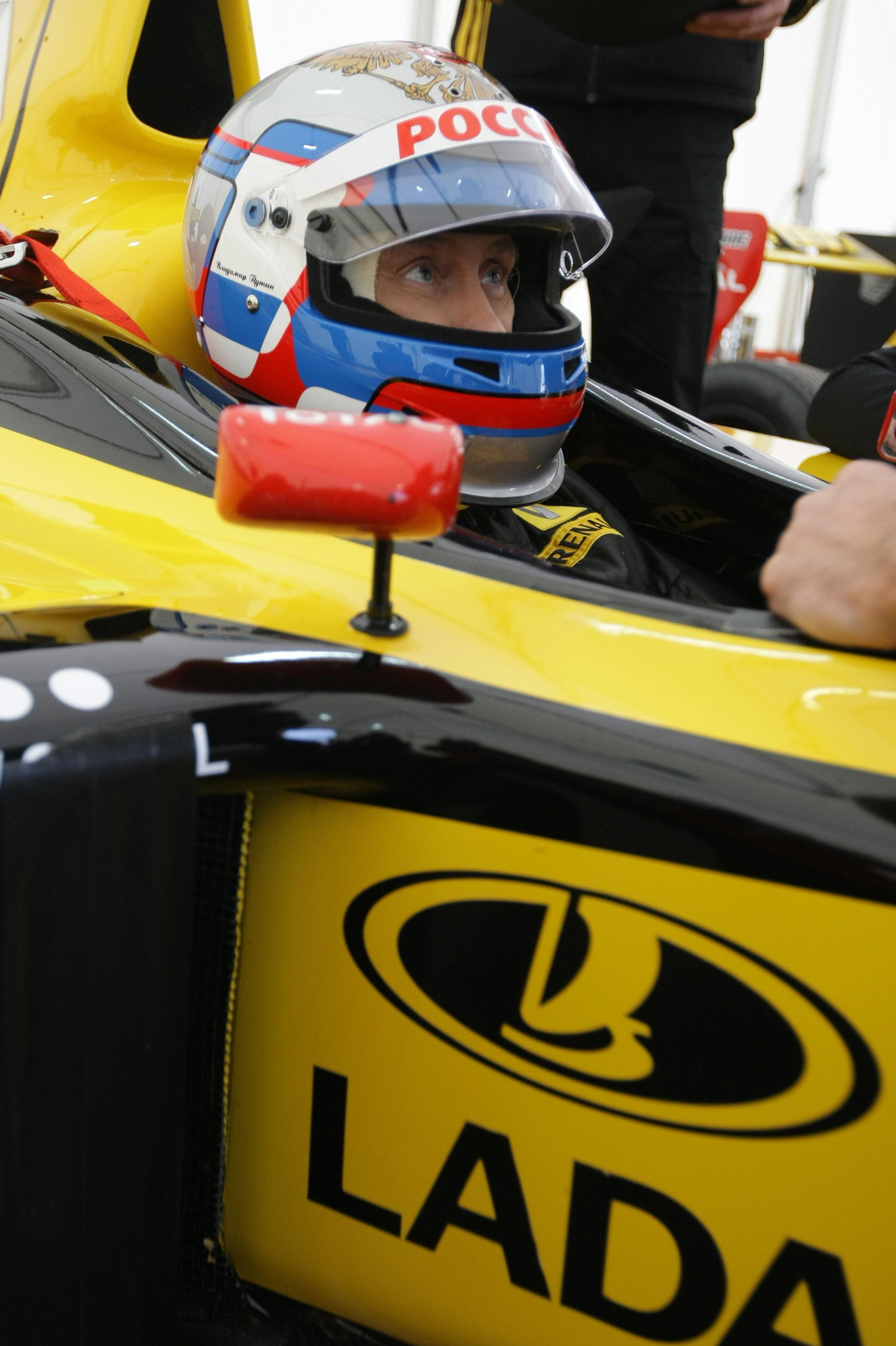
Putin driving a Formula 1 car, 2010 (see the video)

- Driving a race car – Putin tested a modified Prost AP04 F1 race car with a Renault livery on 7 November 2010 in Saint Petersburg, reaching a reported maximum speed of 240 km per hour (149 mph).
- Scuba diving – Putin took part in scuba diving at the archaeological site of the ancient Greek colony of Phanagoria in the Taman Bay on 11 August 2011. During the dive, he "discovered" two amphorae and emerged from the sea exclaiming to television cameras "Treasure!". In October 2011, spokesman Dmitry Peskov told media: "Putin did not find the amphorae on the sea bed that had been lying there for thousands of years [...] They were found during an [archaeological] expedition several weeks or days beforehand. Of course they were then left there [for him to find] or placed there. It is a completely normal thing to do." The New Republic called it an example of Putin Jumping the shark.
- In September 2012, Putin flew in a motorized hang glider alongside endangered Siberian white cranes to "guide them on their migration to Asia."
- Fishing – In July 2013, Putin was pictured in Tuva, Siberia, holding up a large pike that he 'caught' and which the Kremlin claimed weighed 21 kg (46 lb), a very large amount for that species. Many media outlets and internet users questioned whether the fish could have weighed that much. Some bloggers also pointed out that Putin's fishing trip wasn't on the official schedule and that he was photographed wearing clothing identical to that worn during a previous trip to the region.
- In a 2014 art exhibition organised by Putin Supporters group on Facebook, and labelled "bizarre" by BBC News, the Russian leader was depicted in the guise of the all-conquering Ancient Greek hero Heracles. The series of images associated each of twelve various military and political feats performed by Putin with one of the mythological figure's famous Twelve Labors.
- In August 2015, Putin used a submersible to explore a Byzantine shipwreck off the coast of Crimea. "83 metres is a pretty substantial depth," he said in televised comments after the dive. "It was interesting."
- In May 2019, Putin scored 8 goals in an amateur ice hockey league all-star game and was reportedly provided with plenty of scoring opportunities by his linemates and was met with little resistance by the opposing team's defence.
- In April 2021, Putin was named Russia's "most handsome man" in a poll of two thousand conducted by Superjob.ru, a Russian job board site. People from three hundred cities were surveyed. Complex described the selection process as "highly questionable" and emphasized the disproportionate results of the survey.
- On 1 September 2022, in Kaliningrad, Putin was appearing to struggle with control of his legs during a conference with Russian school pupils.

== Singing and painting ==
Putin playing and then singing Blueberry Hill at a charity concert

On 11 December 2010, at a concert organized for a children's charity in Saint Petersburg, Putin sang Blueberry Hill with Maceo Parker's jazz band and played a little piano of it and of the Russian patriotic song С чего начинается Родина from his favourite spy movie The Shield and the Sword. After that he took part in singing of a Russian song about cosmonauts, Grass by the Home. The concert was attended by various Hollywood and European stars such as Kevin Costner, Sharon Stone, Alain Delon, and Gérard Depardieu. Putin also played or sang "С чего начинается Родина" on a number of other occasions, such as a meeting with the Russian spies deported from the U.S., including Anna Chapman. Another melody which Putin is known to play on the piano is the Anthem of Saint Petersburg, his native city.

Putin's painting "Узор на заиндевевшем окне" (A Pattern on a Hoarfrost-Encrusted Window), which he had painted during the Christmas Fair on 26 December 2008, became the top lot at the charity auction in Saint Petersburg and sold for 37 million rubles. The picture was made for a series of other paintings by famous Russians. The painters were required to illustrate one of the letters of the Russian alphabet with a subject connected to Nikolay Gogol's novel Christmas Eve (the 200th anniversary from Gogol's birth was celebrated in 2008). Putin's picture depicted a hoarfrost pattern (Russian: Узор, illustrating the Cyrillic letter У) on a window with curtains sewn with traditional Ukrainian ornaments. The creation of the painting coincided with the 2009 Russia–Ukraine gas dispute, which left a number of European states without Russian gas and amid January frosts.

== In popular culture ==
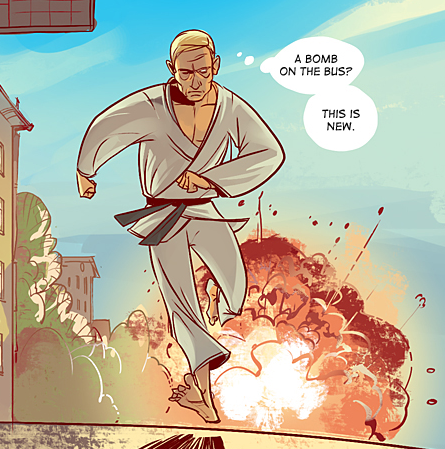
A scene from the Superputin comics

A Russian movie called A Kiss not for Press premiered in 2008 on DVD. The movie is said to be based on the biography of Vladimir Putin and his wife Lyudmila. Dobby, a house elf from Harry Potter film series, has been found to look like Putin, and so was also Daniel Craig in his role of James Bond (he was the first blond actor to play James Bond). There are a large number of songs about Putin. These include:

- Такого, как Путин – "[I Want] A Man Like Putin" by Singing Together
- Гороскоп (Путин, не ссы!) – "Horoscope (Putin, Don't Pee Pee!)" by Uma2rman
- ВВП – "VVP" by a Tajik singer Tolibjon Kurbankhanov (Толибджон Курбанханов)
- Our Madhouse is Voting for Putin by Rabfak. (Рабфак).
- Vladimir - a song by a Polish bard Maleńczuk. The singer said that he planned to release it before the Sochi Olympics, but the Russian annexation of Crimea contributed greatly to the promotion of the song.
- Putin khuylo!, a song originated in Ukraine in 2014 having grown from a football chant
- Putin - a song released in 2022 by Polish singer and producer Cypis denouncing the tragedies of the war after Russia's invasion, gaining tens of millions of views on various social media and trending in many Western and Eastern European countries, including Ukraine.
- In 2012, British synth-pop duo Pet Shop Boys released a song called Hell, which mentions a whole host of people who have made a name for themselves in history through acts of violence, including Putin. There are two other songs in which Putin plays an important role: Hymn (In Memoriam Alexei Navalny) and A Top Secret Washing Machine.

Putin also is a subject of Russian jokes and chastushki, such as "[Before Putin] There Was No Orgasm" featured in the comedy film Election Day. There is a meta-joke that, since the coming of Putin to power, all the classic jokes about a smart yet rude boy called Вовочка (Vovochka, diminutive from Vladimir) have suddenly become political jokes.

Various humorists and anti-Putinists have latched onto the initialism "KhPP" (Russian: ХПП), interpretted as standing for "a cunning Putin plan" (Russian: хитрый план Путина).

Putin features in the coloring-book for children Vova and Dima (presented on his 59th birthday), where he and Dmitry Medvedev are drawn as well-behaved little boys, and in the Superputin online comics series, where Putin and Medvedev are portrayed first as superheroes, and then as a troll and an orc in the World of Warcraft.

Putin was portrayed by internet personality Nice Peter in his YouTube series Epic Rap Battles of History, in Season 2's finale episode, "Rasputin vs. Stalin" (aired on 22 April 2013).

In the wake of the 2022 Russian invasion of Ukraine, leaders at the 48th G7 summit ridiculed Putin's photo ops—particularly his manly, bare-chested photographs with airbrushed muscles—including Boris Johnson.

Documentary films about Putin include the television series The Putin Interviews (2017), Putin's Witnesses (2018) and Putin's Palace (2021), while films include Patryk Vega's Putin (2024).

== Putinisms ==
Alluding to Rudyard Kipling's python Kaa, Putin addresses the Russian non-systemic opposition, who, according to him, work for foreign interests: Come to me, Bandar-logs!

Putin has produced a large number of popular aphorisms and catch-phrases, known as putinisms. Many of them were first made during his annual Q&A conferences, where Putin answered questions from journalists and other people in the studio, as well as from Russians throughout the country, who either phoned in or spoke from studios and outdoor sites across Russia. Putin is known for his often tough and sharp language.

== See also ==
- Bibliography of Vladimir Putin
- Bibliography of Russian history (1991–present)
- Allegations of genocide of Ukrainians in the Russo-Ukrainian War
- Anti-Russian sentiment
- Attacks on civilians in the Russian invasion of Ukraine
- Corruption in Russia
- Death of Alexander Litvinenko
- Death of Alexei Navalny
- Death of Anna Politkovskaya
- Death of Boris Nemtsov
- Gerasimov doctrine
- Human rights in Russia
- Kleptocracy
- List of heads of the executive by approval rating
- Putinism
- Putin's Palace (film)
- Red lines in the Russo-Ukrainian War
- Russia under Vladimir Putin
- Sexual violence in the Russian invasion of Ukraine
- The Man Without a Face: The Unlikely Rise of Vladimir Putin
- Uncle Vova, we are with you!
