= Songs about Vladimir Putin =

Songs about Vladimir Putin may be placed into two distinct categories. Some of them praise various aspects of his personality, varying from viewing him as sex symbol to praising him as a strong leader. Others criticize Putin and protest against his rule.

== Pro Putin ==
Songs of praising type started appearing as soon as Vladimir Putin took the office. An early notable example is the song Takogo, kak Putin! ("[I want] The One Like Putin") by the girl band Singing Together. It topped the Russian Music Charts in 2002.

In 2017 a jingoistic song Uncle Vova, we are with you gained a notoriety when a video was popularized in which Anna Kuvychko, then assistant to a State Duma deputy, performed this song with the schoolchildren in military-style uniforms of the cadet class of Volgograd school no. 44

== Contra Putin ==
- 2009: We Don't Wanna Put In, a song submitted for a contest to represent Georgia in the Eurovision Song Contest 2009
- 2011: К нам в Холуёво приезжает Путин (K nam v Kholuyovo priyezzhayet Putin, 'Putin Comes to Visit Us in Lackeyville') by Andrey Makarevich
- In 2012 Russian rock band Rabfak released an ironic song Our Nuthouse Is Voting for Putin (Наш дурдом голосует за Путина, Nash durdom golosuet za Putina). Its line "Why today is yesterday and not tomorrow?" (Pochemu vmesto zavtra segodnia vchera?) was taken by Eliot Borenstein as an epigraph of his study about Soviet nostalgia, Unstuck in Time: On the Post-Soviet Uncanny
- 2013: Evil Heart by Russian rock band Elisium.
