= List of songs about abortion =

This list contains songs which have lyrics that refer to abortion in some manner.

== 0–9 ==
- "$19.99 A.D." by Qwel (featuring Robust) (2001)
  A song in which rapper Qwel expresses his anti-abortion views. Considering the album the song is featured on in 2007, he stated, "Some of it, I look back on it and I think, I was 19 and complaining about things I didn't know nothing about. I don't think a 19-year-old man should do an abortion song. But I'm older now, I could not have known that then."
- "6794700" by Birmingham 6 (1994)
  A song which criticizes the Catholic Church's position on abortion, featuring the line "Don't hide your shame behind the convent wall/Keep your child or don't give birth at all."

== A ==
- A Piece of Paper" by Gladstone lyrics: "A legal abortion so the family won't know/A piece of paper says the problem won't grow/A piece of paper makes it alright"
- "A Billion Starving People" by Keith Green (1984) A song in which Green expresses a personal desire to prevent abortion, stating: "I find it hard to just ignore The murdered unborn children (...) I want to save a life today"
- "Abortion" by Cars Can Be Blue (2005)
  An irreverent duet in which a couple discuss their plans to get an abortion and then mutually declare "killing this baby was the best choice we ever made!"
- "Abortion" by Doug E. Fresh & the Get Fresh Crew (1986)
  Rap song that describes abortion as a "distortion" and states the "world's morals are out of proportion."
- "Abortion" by Kid Rock (2000)
  A song about a man so grieved by his girlfriend's abortion that he contemplates suicide.
- "Abortion" by Primate (Marcelo Aliaga) from Chile (1994) The song is focus in the angry vision of baby.
- "Abortion Clinic" by Bo Burnham (allegedly 2004–2005)
  A song said to be written when he was 14, highlighting the similarity of pronunciations between the phrases "Feed us" and "Fetus".
- "Abortion Is a Crime" by Alpha Blondy (1994)
  A song in which Alpha Blondy expresses his opposition to abortion.
- "Abortion Is Murder" by P.O.D. (1994)
  A song with an anti-abortion message that was included as a hidden track on the band's debut album Snuff the Punk. Reflecting on the song years after its release, lead vocalist Sonny Sandoval said, "We don't do that stuff anymore, 'cause that's not where we're at. You know, we're not about stepping on people's toes."
- "Act of Love" by Neil Young (featuring Pearl Jam) (1995)
  A song about abortion that Young was inspired to record with Pearl Jam after playing it live with the band at a Voters for Choice benefit concert. Young commented on the song thusly: "See, personally, I'm pro-choice. But the song isn't! This isn't an easy subject to confront head-on. People who say that human beings shouldn't have the right to dismiss a human life - they have a point. You can't dismiss that point. But then there's the reality. There's idealism and reality, the two have got to come together yet there are always major problems when they do."
- "Adiós, mamá" by Trigo Limpio (1976)
  A Spanish-language song written from the perspective of a fetus that comes to terms with the news the woman carrying it intends to have an abortion.
- "All My Life" by Paul Stookey (1990)
  A song about a woman receiving different advice on how to respond to an unplanned pregnancy.
- "All Things Go" by Nicki Minaj (2014)
  A song in which Minaj makes reference to the abortion she had as a teenager.
- "Altering the Future" by Death (1990)
  A song that weighs the potential for abortion and capital punishment to change the course of future events.
- "Amendment" by Ani DiFranco (2012)
  A song calling requesting an amendment to the U.S. Constitution to safeguard gender equality and include abortion access.
- "Animal" by Jean Rohe (2022)
  A personal story of getting pregnant and having an abortion, that also reflects on the power over life and death that we all have, and the limits of that power. The song won the Kerrville Folk Festival New Folk songwriting contest in 2022.
- "At Conception" by Cursive (2006)
  A song about a priest who becomes involved with a teenage girl whose boyfriend is away at war, then urges her to have an abortion when she gets pregnant, although he regularly protests at the clinic.
- "Aurélie" by Colonel Reyel (2011)
  A French-language rap song about a 16-year-old who decides to continue a pregnancy despite her parents and friends advising her to have an abortion. When asked if he opposes abortion in an interview, Colonel Reyel stated he does not, and explained the intent of the song: "What I'm trying to evoke in the story is that it remains above all a personal choice. It's for the girl to decide whether she is able to give life or not, quite simply. And in the case of Aurélie, she feels ready, we must therefore support her rather than bully her."
- "Autobiography" by Nicki Minaj (2008)
  The final verse of this song is about the abortion Minaj had during her teens and the regret she experienced afterward.

== B ==
- "Baby Killer" by Rackets & Drapes (1998)
  A Christian rock song that expresses the band's anti-abortion stance. In an interview, singer Kandy Kane stated the song was "dedicated to Bill Clinton," after he "lift[ed] the law that prevented federal funding for abortion clinics."
- "Baby (Should I Have the Baby?)" by Cindy Lee Berryhill (1989)
  A song about weighing various reproductive options, including ending it through abortion.
- "The Baby Stays" by Sage Francis (2010)
  A song which alternates between the perspective of a man upset by not having a say in his partner's decision to have an abortion, the woman herself, and their baby.
- "Baby's Gone" by Heavens to Betsy (1992)
  A song written from the perspective of a teenage girl speaking to her parents after her death from an attempted self-abortion.
- "A Baby's Prayer" by Kathy Troccoli (1997)
  A song in which a child in heaven asks God to forgive his or her mother for having an abortion.
- "Back Alley Surgery" by Malvina Reynolds (1978)
  A song Reynolds wrote to protest a 1977 U.S. Supreme Court decision allowing restrictions on Medicaid funding of abortion, suggesting it will cause poor women to turn to unsafe means.
- "Bad Religion" by Godsmack (2000)
  According to Godsmack vocalist Sully Erna, a practicing Wiccan, the song has an anti-abortion message. Erna says, "You don't even know me, yet you're deciding to kill me? Look, I'm here. I'm alive inside you. I can't be ignored."
- "Bear", by The Antlers (2009)
  This song is a track on the concept album Hospice, which details the story of a relationship between a hospice worker and a female patient suffering from terminal cancer, their ensuing romance, and their slow downward spiral. When taken out of context, the lyrics appear to be about a couple getting an abortion, however they are actually in reference to the female patient's cancer.
- "The Beat of Black Wings" by Joni Mitchell (1988)
  A song about a shellshocked Vietnam War veteran who finds out his girlfriend had an abortion without telling him.
- "Becky and the Baby" by Jimmy Ibbotson (2005)
  A song about an abortion clinic bombing that kills a reporter covering a protest outside.
- "Bellyache" by Echobelly (1993)
  A song Sonya Madan wrote about the distress her friend went through after having an abortion.
- "Beautiful Life" by Trip Lee (featuring V. Rose) (2012)
  A song in which Lee urges people to opt against abortion and tells those who have already had one that they can find healing in Jesus.
- "The Big 'A' = The Big 'M'" by Gary S. Paxton (1978)
- "The Biggest Hurt" by Barbara Fairchild (1982)
  A song about a woman experiencing profound regret after an abortion.
- "Birthday I.O.U." by All (1993)
  A song Bill Stevenson wrote about what he felt going through an abortion with his girlfriend.
- "Bitchcraft" by Strelnikoff (1998)
  A song mocking religious conservatives who are against abortion. It is written in the voice of a character designed to misrepresent the group. The character vows to correct what he views as morally transgressive behavior. The song was written as a criticism of lobbyists representing the Catholic Church who wanted to change abortion law in the band's native Slovenia.
- "Black Chick, White Guy" by Kid Rock (1998)
  A partly autobiographical song which tells the story of a relationship between an interracial couple, which begins in high school, when the girl gets pregnant and has an abortion.
- "Blood on the Leaves" by Kanye West (2013)
  The third verse of this song is about a man who gets an extramarital lover pregnant and then must inform his wife after his pastor tells him that abortion is not permissible.
- "Bloom" by Brian Anthony Lynch (2021)
  A song about every life being a gift to the world and praying for all lives and those who regret having had abortions. It was released on the contemporary Catholic album "Flicker in the Dusk" as track number 6 in February 2021.
- "Blue Eyes Like Janey's" by David Huff (2003)
  A song about a young couple who experience grief after an abortion and later become anti-abortion activists.
- "Bodies" by The Sex Pistols (1977)
  A song inspired by an obsessed fan and mental asylum patient named Pauline, who once showed John Lydon a fetus, telling him she had gotten pregnant by male nurses at the asylum. In 2009, in response to a conservative website interpreting the song as anti-abortion, Lydon stated, "The lyrics state both cases. I agree with both sides at the same time – not for religious reasons, but for humane ones."
- "Brick" by Ben Folds Five (1997)
  A song singer Ben Folds wrote about taking his girlfriend to have an abortion during their high-school years.
- "Broken Inside" by We As Human (2007)
- "Broken People" by KJ-52 (2009)
  In the second verse of this Christian rap song, a pregnant girl contemplates having an abortion, but ultimately decides against it.
- "Burden In Your Hands" by Underoath (1999)
  A song in which Underoath explain their position on abortion.
- "Butyric Acid" by Consolidated (1994)
  A song that takes issue with some of the more violent acts committed by members of the anti-abortion movement when protesting abortion clinics.

== C ==
- "The Call" by Matt Kennon (2009)
  The second verse concerns a teenage girl about to get an abortion when her boyfriend calls to say he'll marry her and raise the child.
- "Can I Live?" by Nick Cannon (featuring Anthony Hamilton) (2005)
  A song Cannon wrote about how his mother decided not to go through with an abortion while pregnant with him at 17.
- "Candy Apple" by xDISCIPLEx A.D. (1997)
  A song in which the band confront the sugarcoating of abortion by the government.
- "Carry the Blame" by River City People (1989)
  A song about a woman experiencing feelings of guilt after an abortion.
- "Celebrate" by Mack Maine (2013)
  A song in which Mack Maine references his mother's decision not to go through with an abortion while pregnant with him.
- "Certi momenti" by Pierangelo Bertoli (1980)
  An Italian-language song in which Bertoli criticizes a law allowing doctors to opt out of performing abortions on conscience grounds.
- "Children Can Live (Without It)" by DC Talk (1990)
  A song with an anti-abortion message, about which Michael Tait said, "We were told by people that a lot of times 'issue-oriented' albums are not great sellers, or you'll get a lot of flak for them. To best honest with you, we're human, and we didn't want to get laid out again. But if telling the truth hurts, then it's just gonna have to hurt because that's what we're about. You know, racism is sin, abortion – to us – is sin."
- "Choices" by Jeffrey Gaines (1992)
  A song in which Gaines expresses his view that the abortion decision should be left up to women.
- "Choirgirl" by Cold Chisel (1979)
  A song about a man who tries to console his distressed girlfriend prior to an abortion.
- "Chotee" by Bif Naked (1998)
  A song about the abortion Bif Naked had at age 18 while married to her then-drummer.
- "Chow Down" by 7 Year Bitch (1992)
- "Clinic" by Crash Vegas (1995)
  A song about a woman going through an abortion.
- "The Clinic" by Hezekiah (featuring Ishe) (2010)
  The second verse of this song is about what Hezekiah describes as the "pressure of abortion."
- "Coathangers" by Graham Parker & The Rumour (2012)
- "Coin Locker Baby" by MARETU (2015)
- "Con Especial" by Guttermouth. "I don't want a baby and my answer won't be maybe..."
- "Con una estrella" by Ricardo Arjona (1998)
  A Spanish-language song which implores an unmarried pregnant woman not to have an abortion. In a radio interview, Arjona stated, "So it has an explanation in the CD: 'This is just a story, not a point of view,' right? Because I believe that such determinations belong to the people who have to make them, and I do not want to get in the position of having to influence people to see what to do with their lives or the life of someone who has a lot to do with them. That's the reason for the clarification and that's why I did not dare record this issue for so long, in order not to make it a kind of anti-abortion anthem, which was not really what I wanted to capture in this song."
- "Convenient Homicide" by Seventh Seal (2004)
  A song about the band's opposition to abortion, in which they declare, "There is no right to choose/Abortion is murder."
- "Cool" by John Michael Montgomery (2004)
  A song about a young man who considers asking his girlfriend to have an abortion until his dad talks him out of it.
- "Le cordon" by Bigflo & Oli (2015)
  A French-language rap song written as a dialogue between an aborted fetus and the woman who carried it.
- "Coulda Been" by K. Sparks (2009)
- "Curse of Blood" by A.W.E. Band (2009)
  An anti-abortion song that shifts perspective with each verse: the first verse is about the unborn, the second about a woman regretting an abortion, and the third verse about a nation asking God's forgiveness.

== D ==
- "The Dancer" by James Lee Stanley (1988)
  A song that metaphorically addresses facing an unplanned pregnancy, with "the dancer" referred to in the lyrics representing the choice to continue it, or "the sure way" (abortion).
- "Dangerous Place" by Julie Miller (1990)
  A song Miller was inspired to write after reading an anti-abortion tract reshaped her views.
- "Dear Abbie (One Night of Passion)" by Little Sister (1990)
  A song about a teenage girl writing to an advice columnist to ask what she should do about her unplanned pregnancy.
- "December" by Frida Hyvönen (2008)
  A song about a woman who goes to an abortion clinic with her boyfriend.
- "Dégénérations" by Mes Aïeux (2004)
  A French-language folk song with lyrics that mourn the passing of the era when Quebecers had large families and condemn modern women for having abortions.
- "Déjame vivir" by Los Yonic's (1985)
  Written by Yucatecan composer Vicente Uvalle Castillo, it is a Spanish-language song sung from the point of view of the fetus where it asks its mother to reconsider her choice of inducing an abortion.
- "Dejame vivir" by Jenni Rivera (2007)
  A Spanish-language song Rivera wrote as a "plea for life to her mother" after learning that, while pregnant with her, her mother unsuccessfully tried to induce an abortion because she was immigrating from Mexico to the United States and thought it was an inopportune time to have child.
- "Diary of an Unborn Child" by Mark Fox
  An anti-abortion song sung from the point of view of a fetus that chronicles its development from its conception until the moment it is aborted.
- "Didn't Wanna Be Daddy" by Jeffrey Gaines (1992)
  A song Gaines wrote about the conflicting thoughts he had after finding out a woman he was with had an abortion.
- "Die of Shame" by Tilt (1999)
  A song about a young woman who dies giving herself an abortion because her state has a parental consent law and she is too ashamed to talk to her parents.
- "DNA" by Starlito and Don Trip (2013)
  A song about Starlito wrote about having a woman with whom he was involved decide to get an abortion without telling him. The rapper explained that he consulted the woman before choosing to release the song: "I don't even know if people take that as a real thing that happened when they listen to that song, but if she said she wasn't cool with it, I wasn't gonna put that song out. […] I don't want to step on somebody's toes just for my art, not somebody that I care for."
- "Don't Pray on Me" by Bad Religion (1993)
  The third verse includes the lyrics "A bitter debate and a feminine fate/Lie in tandem like two precious babes/While the former gets warmer, it's the latter/That matters except on the nation's airwaves./And custodians of public opinion stayed back/After vainly discussing her rights/Lay hands off her body/It's not your fucking life!"
- "Don't Worry" by I Wayne (2004)
- "Dr. Hatchet" by Seventh Angel (1990)
  A Christian thrash song that accuses doctors who perform abortions of committing murder.
- "Dr. Tiller" by Kendl Winter (2010)
  A song Winter wrote about the 2009 murder of abortion provider Dr. George Tiller.
- "Due in June" / "June" by ¡Mayday! (2012)
  A pair of songs written from the perspective of a fetus. In the first song ("Due in June"), the fetus asks to be aborted, then changes its mind and asks to be born in the second song ("June"). "June" was conceived after "Due in June" had already been recorded because the group felt they "needed another track to balance that out, a way to talk about not having an abortion."

== E ==
- "Elle attend son petit" by Pierre Perret (1981)
  A French-language song in which Perret expresses approval of the 1975 legalization of abortion in France.
- "Epilogue: Juliette" by Miriam Marston (2017) A song about regret and forgiveness after an abortion.
- "Everyday" by The Saw Doctors (1996)
  A song about a young woman from Ireland traveling to England for an abortion.
- "Execution" by Grammatrain (1995)
  A Christian rock song about the band's opposition to abortion.

== F ==
- "La fabbricante d'angeli" by Le Orme (1974)
- "Fallopian Rhapsody" by Lunachicks (1995)
  A song in which the band give reasons they think it is necessary for abortion to be legal.
- Fat Lip by Sum 41 (2001) "Doctor said my mom should've had an abortion (echoed)"
- "F.D.K. (Fearless Doctor Killers)" by Mudhoney (1995)
  A song written as a condemnation of anti-abortion activists who use violence against doctors.
- "Final Request" by Value Pac (1996)
  A song about abortion written from the perspective of the fetus.
- "First Do No Harm" by Michael J. Tinker (2012)
  A song written from the perspective of a fetus seeking a justification from the woman carrying it for her decision to have an abortion.
- "First Trimester" by Illogic (2004)
  A song Illogic wrote based on his experience of having a girlfriend get an abortion without telling him.
- "Foeticide" by Carcass (band) (1988)
  A song with very graphic lyrics describing abortion as brutal murder (hence the title). "Foeticides done daily. Frying them inside the womb. Electrocuting embryos in their sterile tomb."
- "Formidable" by Sylvain Sylvain (1981)
  A song written from the perspective of a man trying to convince his girlfriend not to terminate an unplanned pregnancy.
- "FORMER FETUS 4 - a rock opera"
- "The Freshmen" by The Verve Pipe (1997)
  A song about a girl who commits suicide as a result of the regret she feels for having an abortion.
- "From Womb to Waste" by Dying Fetus (2012)
- "Fugu" by Marianne Dissard (2011)
  A song Dissard described as being "about abortion and also about my relationship with my ex-husband."
- "The Future" by Leonard Cohen (1992)
  The final verse features the lyrics "Destroy another fetus now/We don't like children anyhow/I've seen the future, baby: it is murder."

== G ==
- "Games of Chance and Circumstance" by AD (1985)
  A song that condemns the legalization of abortion in the United States.
- "Get Your Gunn" by Marilyn Manson (1994)
  A song written in reaction to the 1993 murder of abortion provider Dr. David Gunn.
- "The Gift of Life" by Desmond Child (1991)
  A song Child wrote about going through an abortion with his high-school girlfriend and the regret he now feels over it.
- "Giving You Back" by Robyn (1999)
  A song from Robyn's second album My Truth that deals with an abortion she had in 1998.
- "God Are You There" by Eternity Focus (2008)
  A song about teenage girl who has an abortion and is left "tormented day and night by both her choice and her pain."
- "God Has Lodged a Tenant in My Uterus" by Tammy Faye Starlite (2000)
  A satirical country song in which the singer assumes the role of a character whose oft-pregnant mother sung this song to her as a child to instill an anti-abortion viewpoint.
- "Going Through Hell" by Rittz (2014)
  The second verse of this song deals with an abortion the rapper talked his girlfriend into getting and later came to regret.
- "Good, Bad, Ugly" by Lecrae (2014)
  The first part of this song is about how Lecrae took a former girlfriend to get an abortion.
- "Good-Bye April" by Kelita (2010)
  A song Kelita wrote about her regret over opting to have an abortion during a "very difficult time in [her] life."
- "Goose Walking Over My Grave" by Jay Munly (2004)
  A dark folk song that begins with the narrator reluctantly punching his sister, who is pregnant by him, in the stomach at her request.

== H ==
- "Halo" by Machine Head (2006)
  A song that takes a pro abortion, and anti Christian stance.
- "Hands on the Bible" by Local H (2002)
  A song described as being about "guilt over abortion and karma."
- "Happy Birthday" by Flipsyde (2005)
  A song in which a man apologizes to the child he might have had if not for an abortion.
- "Hard to Make a Stand" by Sheryl Crow (1996)
  A song which mentions a woman who is fatally shot on her way to get an abortion.
- "Have Me" by Jerry Blackwell (2008)
  A song written from the perspective of a fetus asking not to be aborted on the basis of its potential.
- "Hellbound" by The Breeders (1990)
  A song about a fetus born alive after an abortion.
- "Hello Birmingham" by Ani DiFranco (1999)
  A song written in response to the 1998 bombing of an abortion clinic in Birmingham, Alabama.
- "Hide My Sin" by Lorene Mann (1971)
  A song about a woman who travels to New York state, which legalized abortion three years prior to the 1973 case Roe v. Wade, for an abortion.
- "History" by Bush (1996)
  Gavin Rossdale has stated that the song is written about abortion from a woman's point of view.
- "Homicide" by Focal Point (1996)
  A song in which the band condemn abortion providers, including the lyrics "A beating heart treated like a worthless piece of trash/I hate what you're doing and I will not let it last."
- "How Was I to Know" by Sal Solo (1987)
  An anti-abortion song sung from the perspective of a fetus to the pregnant woman who does not want it. The song met with negative response upon its release as a single in the United Kingdom in 1987, with radio stations (including Capital Radio and BBC Radio 1) deeming it unsuitable for airplay, and record stores apparently declining to stock it. Solo has credited the song with "more or less" ending his career as a commercial recording artist.
- "Howard" by Rickie Lee Jones (1997)
  A song about a woman haunted by the spirits of the abortions she had. When asked about her views in relation to the song, Jones stated, "I am not sure about the nature of a foetus, if it matters, truly. One wants to hope it matters, because one wants there to be a god, a morality, a good and evil, and if foetuses mattered, it would give some sense that there is in fact more than meets the eye, that the invisible world is filled with spirit, that a being exists even in a couple cells. It may. Or maybe not."
- "Human Garbage Can" by Officer Negative (1999)
- "Hypocrisy" by Nuclear Assault (1991)
  A song in which the band express their support of abortion.

== I ==
- "I Blew Up the Clinic Real Good" by Steve Taylor (1987)
  A satirical song about an ice cream vendor who bombs an abortion clinic because he believes it is depriving him of potential customers.
- "I Can't Afford It (I'm Gonna Have to Abort It)" by Wendy Ho (2010)
  A satirical song in which the narrator declares her intent to have an abortion because she feels she cannot support a child.
- "I Can't Cry" by The Silencers (1987)
  A song about the anguished thoughts of a woman who has chosen to have an abortion.
- "Spanish: Ilegal" by No Te Va Gustar (2006)
  A Spanish-language song, written by a Uruguayan rock band, about the illegality of abortion in Latin America, and what the group views as the hypocrisy of society on the subject.
- "I Luv Abortion" by Xiu Xiu (2012)
  A song that Jamie Stewart wrote based on the experience of a teenage fan with whom he corresponds by e-mail, who found herself pregnant and decided to have an abortion because she felt she was not ready for parenthood.
- "If I Were a Killer" by Galactic Cowboys (1993)
  A song that presents abortion as rationalized murder, featuring lines such as "If I were a killer, I'd hide behind a doctor's door."
- "I Hear Your Voice" by Darko Zoric (2014)
- "If These Walls Could Talk" by U.S. Girls (2011)
- "I'll Be Good To You, Baby (A Message to the Silent Victim)" by Andraé Crouch (1981)
  A song written from the perspective of God talking to an aborted fetus.
- "I'll Live Yesterdays" by Lee Hazlewood (1971)
  A song about a man who would rather dwell in memories than carry on with a failing relationship after an abortion.
- "In America" by Creed (1997)
  A song that contains the line "Only in America we kill the unborn to make ends meet."
- "In te" by Nek (1993)
  An Italian-language song written by Antonello de Sanctis about a past relationship in which his partner had an abortion without telling him.
- "In the Fields" by Sara Hickman (1990)
  A song about a woman remembering an old relationship, from how it began, to how it ended after an abortion.
- "In the Line of Fire" by Dogwood (1997)
  A song about abortion written from the fetus's point of view.
- "In the Morning" by Anika Moa (2005)
  A song Moa wrote about the abortion she had when she was 20.
- "Into the Slaughter Basement" by Here Comes the Kraken (2009)
- "Invetro" by Organized Konfusion (1997)
  A song in which duo Prince Po and Pharoahe Monch take on the role of twin fetuses inside the uterus of a crack-addicted woman, one preferring to be aborted rather than face a bleak future, and the other hoping to experience the world despite any possible adversities.
- "Isobel" by Dido (1999)
  A song about a teenage girl leaving Ireland to have an abortion that Dido co-wrote with her brother Rollo Armstrong. When asked about her song "Thank You" being sampled on the Eminem track "Stan", Dido responded, "I certainly write songs about things that haven't happened to me, and they're just not quite as shocking. Like, 'Isobel' is about abortion. I'm not saying whether I think it's right or not."
- "It's Not the Time" by Kendall Payne (1999)
  A song about a teenage girl struggling over whether or not to have an abortion.
- "It's Up To You" by Bigod 20 (1993) Song stressing that the decision to abort should lie with the woman and not with politicians and religious figures
- "I Want to Live" by The Right Brothers (2006)
  A song sung from the perspective of a fetus urging the young woman carrying it to choose adoption over abortion.
- "I Would Die For That" by Kellie Coffey (2007)
  The first verse of this song, which Coffey wrote about her experience with infertility, references a friend's abortion as a point of contrast.

== J ==
- "Jesus save... (I, lucifer pt. VI)" by Babylon Mystery Orchestra (2010)
- "Jesus Loves You" by Jewel (2001)
  The final verse includes the lyrics "They say abortion sends you to a fiery hell/ That is if the fanatics don't beat Satan to the kill."
- "Judge's Chair" by Peggy Seeger (1996)
  A song about unsafe abortion that Seeger wrote for NARAL. It was not well received by the organization according to her: "They didn't like [it] at all. It's not what they wanted. On the other hand, it stops people in their tracks. And it stops me in my tracks when I sing it. What they wanted was an anthem that everybody could join in and sing on."

== K ==
- "Karmageddon" by Iyah May (2024)
  A song in which the artist—a medical doctor—lists a number of "social ills" and controversies, among them "abortion rights", noting sarcastically that "You better pick a tribe and hate the other side".
- "Killers of the Unborn" by Barren Cross (1988)
  A song about abortion written from the perspective of a fully sentient fetus.
- "Kitchenware & Candybars" by Stone Temple Pilots (1994)
  A song that Scott Weiland wrote about going through an abortion with a former girlfriend.
- "KKKill the Fetus" by Esham (1993)
  A song that encourages pregnant women who are addicted to drugs to have abortions.

== L ==
- "L'Annonciation" by Mylène Farmer (1985)
  A song about an abortion after a rape.
- "La Femme Fétal" by Digable Planets (1993)
  A song in which rapper Butterfly gives reasons why he thinks access to abortion should be protected. Fellow group member Ladybug offered the following thoughts on the song in a 2005 interview: "We didn't make a conscious decision [to address issues]. We are conscious of our environments and of our lives and we take true situations in our lives and put it into songs. So that is an issue that every young person has to deal with at some point in time when you start having intercourse and sexual relations and stuff."
- "Legal Kill" by King's X (1990)
- "Let Me Live" by Pat Boone (1984)
  Described by Boone as "the anthem of the unborn child," this song features a children's choir, who take on the role of fetuses in a dream of Boone's, describing fetal development up to three months.
- "Let's Get Out of Here" by Blessid Union of Souls (2008)
  A song written from the perspective of a fetus trying to convince the woman carrying it to leave an abortion clinic waiting room.
- "Life Inside You" by Matthew West (2008)
  A song about a teenage girl who considers abortion after becoming pregnant by her substance-using boyfriend, but opts against it, giving birth to a son and marrying the father after he overcomes his addiction.
- "Lime Tree" by Bright Eyes (2007)
  The first verse of this song is about an abortion: "I keep floating down the river but the ocean never comes / Since the operation I heard you're breathing just for one / Now everything is imaginary, especially what you love / You left another message said it's done / It's done."
- "Little One" by Madison Greene (1998)
  A song which violinist Erin Beck wrote about her regret over having an abortion. It is featured as a hidden track on the band's 1998 album White Stone Gathering.
- "Little Ones" by Phil Keaggy (1980)
  A song in which the singer pleads for people to stand up for the rights of the unborn.
- "La Loi de 1920" by Antoine (1966)
  A song criticizing the 1920 French anti-abortion law.
- "Lone Star" by The Front Bottoms (2013)
  A song about a young couple dealing with the feelings they experience following an abortion.
- "Lost Ones" by J. Cole (2011)
  A song written as a dialogue between a couple facing a pregnancy, with Cole alternating between the voice of the man, who suggests an abortion, and the woman, who rejects this idea.
- "Lost Woman Song" by Ani DiFranco (1990)
  A song in which DiFranco recounts the abortion she had after becoming pregnant in 1988.
- "Lucy" by Skillet (2009)
  A song about a young couple struggling with sadness and regret after an abortion. They see a counsellor who suggests that to overcome these feelings they should treat the abortion like a death in the family, and so they hold a funeral, buy a headstone, and choose the name Lucy to put on it.

== M ==
- "Malediction" by Atomic Opera (2000)
  A song that condemns abortion as evil and asks God to bring judgment on the United States for legalizing it.
- "Malenkoye chudo" (Маленькое чудо, "Small Miracle") by Singing Together (2002)
  A Russian-language song that encourages young women considering abortion to opt against it.
- "Mama Mama" by Judy Collins (1982)
  A song about a mother of five and her ambivalence over her decision to abort an unintended pregnancy.
- "Mandy Goes to Med School" by The Dresden Dolls (2006)
  A tongue-in-cheek song in which Amanda Palmer imagines herself and bandmate Brian Viglione as back alley abortionists.
- "Manhattan, Kansas" by Susan Werner (2011)
  A song about a college student who opts for abortion when her boyfriend declines to offer her support and has to be escorted by police past protesters at the clinic.
- "Maria" by Roberta D'Angelo (1976)
  An Italian-language song about a woman who undergoes a risky illegal abortion and "returns to live a little longer but even more alone."
- "Mary and Child" by Born Against (1991)
  A song in which the band express their pro-abortion views.
- "Miracle" by Whitney Houston (1990)
  A song L.A. Reid and Babyface wrote about a woman who had an abortion and later felt she made a mistake. When asked if the song was intended to convey an anti-abortion message, Houston stated, "I didn't sing it with that in mind. I think about the air we breathe, the earth we live on. I think about our children. I think about a lot of things, things God put here for us to have, things that we need and take for granted. I think all of these things are miracles and I think we should try to take better care of them."
- "Moment Of Silence" by Salem Ilese (2022) A song which criticizes the 2022 overturning of Roe v Wade, juxtaposing it with the lack of gun control in the United States. Lyrics include "I'll never understand/How someone's "pro-life" all the way, but still remains pro-NRA".
- "Moral Majority" by Dead Kennedys (1981)
  A song that criticizes the now-defunct conservative organization Moral Majority, featuring the accusation, "You don't want abortions, you want battered children."
- "Mortal Seed" by Ephraim Lewis (1992)
  A song Lewis wrote about the experience of his girlfriend going through an abortion.
- "Murder Is Your Name" by Venia (2008)
- "Murder Me" by Harvey Stripes (2013)
- "Murder She Wrote" by Chaka Demus & Pliers (1994)
  A song about a woman who has developed a negative reputation in her neighborhood for allegedly having multiple abortions.
- "Musa di nessuno" by Afterhours (2008)
  An Italian-language song about a man who feels helpless when his partner decides to have an abortion. In an interview, Afterhours frontman Manual Angnelli stated the song was "a piece on lack of communication between men and women," and that it was written for the purpose of "telling a story, the emotions and feelings so raw, without taking sides."
- "My Special Child" by Sinéad O'Connor (1991)
  A song O'Connor wrote about her decision to end a planned pregnancy in 1990 after the breakdown of a relationship.
- "My Story" by Jean Grae (2008)
  An autobiographical song about the abortion Grae had at age 16. Grae has stated her intent with the song was to give listeners a vivid picture of her experience: "The whole idea of it was, no, I wanted to do a song that was this real about it. Taking you into the room. The anaesthetic. You're going through the whole process, especially experiencing it as a teenager. And not having anyone to share that with."
- "Morticians Flame" by Acid Bath (1994)

== N ==
- "Nemoy krik" (Немой крик, "Silent Scream") by Otto Dix (2009)
  A Russian-language song about abortion that the group were inspired to write by an anti-abortion documentary of the same name.
- "Nerea" by Sauti Sol (2015)
  A Swahili-language song written from the perspective of a man encouraging his lover Nerea to opt against abortion.
- "Never Been Born (Mercy)" by Stan Fortuna (1998)
  A Catholic rap song written from the perspective of an aborted fetus in heaven asking their parents to find Jesus.
- "Nine-Month Blues" by Peggy Seeger (1975)
  A song about how failed contraception leads to unintended pregnancy Seeger was commissioned to write by the National Abortion Committee.
- "No Apology" by Anti-Flag (1999)
  A song in which the band speculate that banning abortion would not prevent it from happening and would lead to women dying from unsafe abortions.
- "No lo perdona Dios" ("That's Not Forgiven by God") by Aventura (1999)
- "Non, tu n'as pas de nom" ("No, you don't have a name") by Anne Sylvestre (1973)
  A song considered "the anthem of the fight for abortion rights" in France.
- "Not a Solution" by Chokehold (1995)
  A song that criticizes the anti-abortion movement, including those of the band's contemporaries in the vegan straight edge scene that adhered to the hardline philosophy, which includes opposition to abortion.
- "Nude as the News" by Cat Power (1996)
  An autobiographical song about an abortion Chan Marshall had at the age of 20.

== O ==
- "Oasis" by Amanda Palmer (2008)
  An upbeat pop song about a teenage girl who has an abortion after being date raped at a party, but quickly dismisses the significance of her experience when she receives a signed picture from her favorite band, Oasis. Palmer explained that the song was intended to be "funny and dark" rather than offensive, stating, "When you cannot joke about the darkness of life, that's when the darkness takes over."
- "Odious" by Vigilantes of Love (1991)
  A song written from the perspective of a man who bombs an abortion clinic. Frontman Bill Mallonee explained the song thusly: "I am not the character nor do I advocate the bombing of abortion clinics. Violence only begets violence. However, one must understand what righteous anger might look like when all options are closed off."
- "Operation Rescue" by Bad Religion (1990)
  A pro-abortion song written as a rebuttal to Randall Terry and the conservative anti-abortion organization Operation Rescue.

== P ==
- "Papa Don't Preach" by Madonna (1986)
  Covered by Kelly Osbourne A song about a girl who decides to carry her pregnancy to term despite the fear of disappointing her father.
- "Pennsylvania Is…" by Everclear (1993)
  A song that criticizes legal restrictions on abortion brought into place in Pennsylvania under governor Robert P. Casey.
- "Piccola storia ignobile" by Francesco Guccini (1976)
  An Italian-language song about a woman undergoing an illegal abortion that Guccini based on common elements from personal stories related to him by several women.
- "Piece of my Soul" by Jim Christopher (1997) A song about a man who discovers that a one-night stand he had resulted in a pregnancy, which was aborted before he ever found out about it, and how he agrees that she made the right call.
- "Plastic Rose" by Dave Alvin (1991)
  A song about a young couple waiting in a coffee shop before an appointment for an abortion.
- "Play With the Boys" by Exude (1985)
  A song about a high school sports star whose girlfriend, a cheerleader, gets pregnant and has an abortion without telling him.
- "Please, Survive!" by Lightmare (1997)
  A song about a woman considering having an abortion that ends with a prayer that she will not go through with it.
- "Porch" by Pearl Jam (1991)
  As with many of Pearl Jam's early songs, the lyrics are open for interpretation. When performing this song on live TV though, in MTV unplugged (1991), frontman Vedder had the words "Pro Choice" written on his arm, and later that year at Saturday Night Live, he wore a T-shirt with a wire hanger and added the lyrics "A woman has every right to choose...// Choose for herself".
- "Potter's Field" by Anthrax (1993)
  A song about a criminal blaming his mother for choosing not to have an abortion due to her religious convictions.
- "Poussière d'ange" by Ariane Moffatt (2002)
  A French-language song Moffatt wrote about her friend's experience with going through an abortion.
- "Prawo do życia, czyli kochanej mamusi" (Right of life, or to the beloved mommy) by Prowokacja (1984).
  Polish anti-abortion punk rock song. Lyrics states that abortion is a murder and lack of respect for human being. It also contain phrase: Felon mothers, impious mothers.
- "Przez sen" by Natalia Przybysz Song about a woman contemplating abortion.
- "Pro LC" by Jenni Potts (2008)
  A song about abortion described by Potts as featuring three distinct voices: "the doctor," "the voice of desire," and "an overwhelming feeling of shock and guilt." Potts further explained that, although the title stands for both "pro-life" and "pro-choice," she dislikes such labels: "I've always hated those terms because it takes a very serious thing and turns it into an 'opinion.' I totally understand both sides. This song goes beneath all of that."
- "The Promise" by The Front (1984)
- "Protestors" by Christafari (featuring Papa San, Mr. Lynx. Monty G, and the GospelReggae.com All-Stars) (2009)
  An ensemble reggae track in which the vocalists collectively declare their intent to stand against abortion. Christafari founder Mark Mohr explained that he tried to write a song dealing with abortion for several years, but eventually decided "I'm not going to sing this song, I'm going to have gospel reggae artists worldwide sing this song," each of whom contributed to the lyrics so that "it wasn't just my story, it's their story."
- "Pro- (Your) Life" by Arab Strap (1999)
  A song in which the narrator tells his partner abortion is the best option for them given their current circumstances.
- "Pulling Weeds" by Faster Pussycat (1989)
  A song that came out around the time of U.S. Supreme Court's Webster v. Reproductive Health Services ruling.
- "Pure Imagination" by Second Nature (2013)
  A song which uses the metaphor of prison to examine the issue of abortion.
- "Push Dawta Push" by Jah Bull (1979)
  A song in which Jah Bull condemns women for having abortions and encourages them to give birth to increase the population.

== Q ==
- "Quartering Alive" by Creation of Death (1991)
  A song by a Christian heavy metal band which describe the process of an abortion, labeling it as murder.

== R ==
- "Rapid City, South Dakota" by Kinky Friedman (1974)
  A song Friedman has described as "the only pro-choice country song", which tells the story of a young man who skips town after getting his girlfriend pregnant, leaving a farewell letter and feeling reassured by the knowledge that she plans to see a "doctor in Chicago."
- "Rainy Day" by Pigeon John (featuring RedCloud) (2005)
  Features a verse in which Pigeon John thanks his mother for not going through with the abortion she considered while pregnant with him. Commenting on the song, the rapper said, "I wanted to share how a human's simple choice does bring life or death. There is no in between. It just looks grey."
- "Real Killer" by Tech N9ne (2001)
  A song in which Tech N9ne recalls his real-life involvement in several abortions by creating a narrative in which he arranges them like hits.
- "Rebecca Rodifer" by The Gaunga Dyns (1967)
  A song about a teenage girl who dies as a result of an illegal abortion.
- "Red Ragtop" by Tim McGraw (2002)
  A song about a young couple who drift apart after an abortion.
- "The Resistance" by Drake (2010)
  A song in which Drake mentions an abortion had by a woman he was involved with briefly.
- "Retrospect for Life" by Common (featuring Lauryn Hill) (1997)
  A song about how Common and his girlfriend found themselves facing an unplanned pregnancy and opted against abortion.
- "The Right to Choose" by Oi Polloi (1999)
  A song that condemns violence against abortion providers.
- "Righteous Seed" by Extra Life (2012)
  A song which frontman Charlie Looker described as "about choosing abortion."
- "Ripped to Shreds" by Dead Pharisees (1998)
  A song featuring a graphic depiction of abortion from the perspective of the fetus.
- “River” by Eminem (2017) In this song featuring Ed Sheeran, Eminem expresses pain and regret after getting a woman he was hooking up with pregnant.
- "Rock A Bye Bye" by Extreme (1989)
  A song which draws a parallel between abortion and the nursery rhyme "Rock-a-bye Baby".
- "Roses" by Steve Green (1998)
  A song in which Green likens abortion to plucking roses before they have bloomed.
- "Rosie Jane" by Malvina Reynolds (1975)
  A song Reynolds wrote in support of the 1973 Roe v. Wade decision. It features a lyrical dialogue between a woman facing an unplanned pregnancy and a condescending doctor. According to Reynolds' daughter, Reynolds wrote the song about her friend, singer-songwriter Rosalie Sorrels, but chose not to reveal this during her own lifetime out of concern it would upset Sorrels.
- "Rosslyn Road" by Mike & Billy Nicholls (2008)
  A song Billy Nicholls wrote based on having once seen a young man hand money to a young woman outside an abortion clinic in London.
- "RU 486" by The Pain Teens (1993)
  A song that expresses the band's opinion that the abortifacient drug mifepristone is "a wonderful invention."
- "Run Away" by Bubba Sparxxx (featuring Frankie J) (2006)
  A song in which a young couple from a small town run away together, and halfway through their trip, the girl reveals that she did not go through with an intended abortion and is still pregnant.
- "Runaway Love" by Ludacris (featuring Mary J. Blige) (2006)
  A song which refers to an 11-year-old girl who gets pregnant by an older boyfriend and cannot afford an abortion.

== S ==
- "Safe" by Eligh and Jo Wilkinson (featuring Pigeon John and Slug of Atmosphere) (2009)
  The first verse of this song is about a woman who picks up the phone to make an appointment for an abortion but hangs it up after looking at her sleeping child.
- "Sally's Pigeons" by Cyndi Lauper (1993)
  A song sung from the perspective of a woman whose best friend died from an unsafe abortion, written by Lauper and Mary Chapin Carpenter.
- "Samantha (What You Gonna Do?)" by Cellarful of Noise (1988)
  A song about a pregnant schoolgirl struggling over whether or not to keep her appointment for an abortion.
- "Sara" by Fleetwood Mac (1979)
  A song Stevie Nicks wrote about the abortion she had after becoming pregnant by her then-boyfriend Don Henley. Henley claimed this was the meaning behind the song in a 2000 interview. In 2014, Nicks confirmed Henley's account, stating, "Had I married Don and had that baby, and had she been a girl, I would have named her Sara."
- "Scream of the Butterfly" by Acid Bath (1994)
- "Sea of Blood" by Radiohalo (1992)
- "The Secret" by Vin Garbutt (1989)
  A song about women who secretly bear regret over having had an abortion.
- "See No Evil" by Holy Soldier (1990)
  A song from the band's debut album, Holy Soldier, which features the dialog of an aborted fetus.
- "See You Fall" by How to Dress Well (2014)
  A song which was inspired by two past girlfriends of the musician, one of whom had an abortion during their time together, the other a miscarriage.
- "The Senator" by Si Kahn and John McCutcheon (1986)
  A song about an anti-abortion U.S. senator who mysteriously finds himself pregnant and has a doctor decline his request for an abortion because "the law's the law."
- "Sentaku no asa" (選択の朝, "Morning Choice") by Aya (2002)
  A Japanese-language song about a teenage girl facing having an abortion.
- "Se quiere, se mata" by Shakira (1996)
  A Spanish-language song about a teenage girl from a well-to-do family who gets pregnant and dies after having an abortion.
- "Shasta (Carrie's Song)" by Vienna Teng (2004)
  A song about a woman driving home from a clinic after deciding not to go through with an abortion.
- "She" by Reid Jamieson from 'Me Daza' written for Ireland's referendum to repeal the 8th amendment. It chooses only the woman's side in that regardless of which choice is made, she will pay.
- "She Wore a Red Carnation" by Candye Kane (1994)
  A song Kane wrote based on a story she read about a woman who went to Mexico for an illegal abortion.
- "Shit, Man!" by Skylar Grey (featuring Angel Haze) (2013)
  A song in which the narrator, facing an unplanned pregnancy, expresses her desire not to have an abortion to her partner.
- "Si Je T'avais Écouté" by Les Nubians (1998)
  A French-language song about a teenage girl who has an abortion.
- "Sibling Rivalry" by Sackcloth Fashion (1999)
  An anti-abortion song in which two male rappers take on the role of twin fetuses while a female vocalist assumes the role of the pregnant girl who ultimately has an abortion.
- "Sie hat geschrien" by Selig (1994)
  A German-language song about a young woman who gets an abortion.
- "Silent Cry" by Robert Pierre (2011)
  A song in which Pierre encourages people to take a stand against abortion.
- "Silent Scream" by The Crucified (1986)
  An anti-abortion song that asks "Does only God and my heart hear the baby's silent scream?"
- "Silent Scream" by Tony Melendez (1991)
- "Silent Scream" by Slayer (1988)
  A song that highlights abortion in violent terms, including the lyrics, "Silent scream/Bury the unwanted child/Beaten and torn/Sacrifice the unborn."
- "Silent Scream" by Stutterfly (2002)
  A song written from the perspective of a fetus asking the woman carrying it not to have an abortion and afterward saddened with her going through with it.
- "Sixteen Thousand Faces" by Pat Boone (1985)
  A song Boone wrote to protest the U.S. Supreme Court's decision to uphold a ruling that prevented the mass burial of 16,000 fetuses found at the home of a former medical lab owner in 1982.
- "Slide" by The Goo Goo Dolls (1998)
  A song about a young couple debating whether to have an abortion or get married.
- "Sometimes Miracles Hide" by Bruce Carroll (1991)
  A song about a couple who are given an unfavorable prenatal diagnosis but decide against abortion due to their faith in God.
- "Song Groove (A/K/A Abortion Papers)" by Michael Jackson (1987)
  A song about a Christian girl who decides to have an abortion although it is against her beliefs. The song was recorded during the sessions for Jackson's album Bad, but was not released until 2012 on the compilation Bad 25.
- "Song X" by Neil Young (featuring Pearl Jam) (1995)
  A song dealing with the 1993 murder of abortion provider Dr. David Gunn.
- "Speculum" by Adema (2001)
  A song about an unidentified band member whose girlfriend got pregnant and had an abortion without telling him.
- "Spin" by Taking Back Sunday (2006)
  Features the lyrics "The abortion that you had/It left you clinically dead and made it all that much easier to lie/Said, 'It's nothing that I'm proud of'/Well, It's nothing that I'm proud of."
- "Spirit of the Age" by Michael Card (1987) A song comparing modern day abortion practices to child sacrifice in ancient cultures.
- "Stomach Ghost" by The Darling DeMaes (2008)
  A song which band member Erik Virtanen described as being about "abortion and two people breaking up and singing it in a really happy way."
- "Story of Her Life" by Mukala (1998)
  A song about an abortion decision which Dan Muckala described as being written from "the standpoint of the person that was aborted" and exploring "what might have been the story of her life."
- "The Stranger" by Kat Eggleston (1994)
  A song which gives an account of the experience of going through an abortion.
- "Sunshine and Dandelions" by Cosmo Jarvis (2009)
  A song Jarvis wrote to contrast what he described as the "potential beauty" of a relationship that leads to a pregnancy with the "sometimes emotionally detached" decision to have an abortion.
- "Superman" by Marry Me Jane (1997)
  A song about the thoughts a woman has after an abortion, wondering if her child would have been "Superman," "an idiot," etc.
- "The Survivor" by Phil Keaggy (1995)
  A song written from the perspective of a baby born alive after an abortion.

== T ==
- "Tears Fall" by BarlowGirl (2009)
  A song that expresses that abortion is a tragic loss of life.
- "That Hospital" by Loudon Wainwright III (1995)
  The third verse of this song recounts Wainwright's experience of going to a hospital with his then-wife Kate McGarrigle in 1976 for an abortion, and, after she opted against it, returning there for the birth of a "little girl." When Wainwright's daughter Martha was asked if this referred to her, she responded, "Yeah. He doesn't make up a lot."
- "That's Love" by Ricochet (2004)
  The first verse of this song is about a young woman opting not to go through with an abortion.
- "These Three Things" by Type O Negative (2007)
  A song that condemns abortion and suggests that those who have one will go to hell. Josh Silver, the band's keyboardist, stated that, while he disagreed with the message of some of the lyrics frontman Peter Steele wrote for the album Dead Again, he supported Steele's expression of his views: "Honestly, I'd rather deal with a guy whose views I don't agree with than a guy who has no views. Probably 90 percent of music today is mediocre, view-less shit. Type O has always had opinions; sometimes they're horrific, sometimes they're depressed, but we'll always have opinions."
- "Third Planet" by Modest Mouse (2000)
  A couple goes through a number of difficult life events, including an abortion. "A third had just been made, and we were swimming in the water / Didn't know then, was it a son was it a daughter [...] Reminding you we used to be three and not just two."
- "This Time" by John Elefante (2013)
  A song about a teenage girl who decides not to go through with an abortion after God speaks to her in the waiting room of the clinic. Elefante has explained that the song was inspired by his adopted daughter's story: "This is one [of] the easiest songs I have ever written. I was able to put myself in the place and time where my daughter was so close to being aborted. It was so divinely vivid to me because this story was meant to be told."
- "Tip Toe" by Ani Difranco (1995)
  A beat poem in which the pregnant woman speaks to her unborn child whilst standing on a pier in Jersey at sunset, before her appointment at the abortion clinic.
- "Tomorrow" by Mat Kearney (2004)
  A song about a woman facing a pregnancy after her partner has walked out on her, which urges her not to have an abortion.
- "A Tool to Scream" by Zao (2001)
  A song with lyrics that condemn abortion. In an interview with a Dutch music website, guitarist Scott Mellinger stated, "We are seen as a pro-life band, but essentially we are as a band for nothing," and that though he personally views abortion as "tantamount to the murder of a child" he thinks it is "no business of the government to say it is not allowed."
- "To Zion" by Lauryn Hill (1998)
  A song about how Hill chose to give birth to son Zion although advised to have an abortion on account of her music career.
- "Traffic" by Stereophonics (1997)
  The lyric "to kill an unborn scare" in the second verse of this song refers to abortion.

== U ==
- "Unbeschreiblich weiblich" by Nina Hagen (1978)
- "Unborn Child" by The Rep (2009)
  A song written from the perspective of a fetus about to be aborted.
- "Unborn Child" by Seals and Crofts (1974)
  A song with lyrics written by Dash Crofts' sister-in-law that asks women considering abortion to rethink their decision. Commenting on the song, Crofts said, "It is our effort to make people aware of when life begins, which we feel is at conception. We feel that each soul has the right to grow without the development being prevented."
- "Unborn Me" by G. Finale (featuring J'Maine Jones) (2013)
  A song G. Finale wrote based on his experience of having a girlfriend decide to have an abortion. The song begins with the man's perspective in the first verse, shifts to the woman's perspective in the second verse, and concludes with the fetal perspective in the last verse.
- "The Unseen" by Geto Boys (1992)
  An explicit rap song about how abortion needs to be stopped.
- "Up All Night" by Charlotte Martin (2003)
  A song about a teenage girl grappling with whether to have an abortion.

== V ==
- "Voicemail For Jill" by Amanda Palmer (2019)
  A song describing how the decision to have an abortion is just as important and life changing as the decision to have a child is, suggesting the idea of celebrating an abortion like one would celebrate a wanted pregnancy.

== W ==
- "Warm Sentiments" by Arrested Development (1994)
  A song in which the narrator confronts his girlfriend for having an abortion without telling him. In an interview, group member Speech explained the song's intent, stating, "The song is basically about relationships, about communication, as opposed to me trying to dictate what she does with that child. It's not pro-choice or pro-life."
- "Water & Bridges" by Kenny Rogers (2006)
  A song about a young man who takes his girlfriend to get an abortion and later questions whether this was the right decision.
- "What Do You Say" by Robert Galea (2008)
  A song featuring a dialogue between a woman in distress and the fetus she is carrying which Galea wrote for an anti-abortion campaign in his native Malta.
- "What If I" by Lyrycyst (featuring Rachael Lampa) (2006)
  A song about how grateful Lyrycyst is that his mother, at the age of 15, chose to give birth to him rather than have an abortion.
- "What It's Like" by Everlast (1998)
  A song in which one of three characters is a pregnant teenager considering having an abortion.
- "Whatever Happened to Sin" by Steve Taylor (1983) The first verse accuses Christians who condone or encourage abortion of compromising their beliefs.
- "What's Going On" by Remy Ma (featuring Keyshia Cole) (2006)
  A song about a rapper who struggles with the decision to have an abortion after initially trying to deny her pregnancy.
- "When Under Ether" by PJ Harvey (2007) Harvey sings from the perspective of someone as they undergo the procedure.
- "White Crosses" by Against Me! (2010)
  A song written to object to an anti-abortion display of 4,000 white crosses called the "Cemetery of the Innocent" that was set up on the lawn of a church across the street from where Laura Jane Grace lived at the time she wrote much of the album White Crosses, which she described as an "eyesore."
- "Who's the Victim" by The Lead (1989)
  A hardcore punk song written from the perspective of a woman who finds out she is pregnant and is advised to have an abortion. The second half expresses regret over going through with this choice.
- "Why Oh Why" by Holly Near (1996)
  A song written from the perspective of a mother of six who dies from a back-alley abortion she seeks because she cannot support another child.
- "Will the Fetus be Aborted" by Jello Biafra and Mojo Nixon (1994)
  Sung to the tune of the Christian country folk hymn "Will the Circle Be Unbroken", the song humorously presents several reasons why one might seek an abortion, such as addiction, incest or rape, the health of the mother, or being unable to support the baby, before contrasting in the last verse with Tanya, a revolutionary who has "fifteen commie babies/Phyllis Schlafly, ain't that great?".
- "Willie Mae" by Steve Arrington (1985)
  A song about a child who is born to a couple after they opt not to go through with an abortion, and eventually dies because her parents cannot afford to feed her.
- "Wisdom Is Watching" by Carrie Newcomer (1995)
  A song which Newcomer wrote in response to the 1993 murder of abortion provider David Gunn.
- "Woman Child" by Harry Chapin (1972)
  A song about a teenage girl who gets pregnant by an adult man and has an abortion with money he provides her.
- "Womb" by Wumpscut (1997)
  A song written in the voice of a fetus, which responds to the woman carrying it that, even though she is considering abortion, it intends to be with her "for the rest of [her] miserable days."

== Y ==
- "You Can't Be Too Strong" by Graham Parker (1979)
  A song that gives an account of abortion from a man's perspective. Parker commented on the song on his official website in 1999: "...my impressions of such a powerful experience are not one-dimensional, and this is apparent in the song to all but the most narrow persons who might decide to misconstrue its meaning and my standing on the subject for their own, political/moral prejudice."
- "You My Child" by Stuart Davis (1995)
- "You vs Them" by Jhené Aiko (2011)
- "Your Escape" by Tragedy Ann (2000)
  An anti-abortion song that asks "Is your convenience something that's justified to you?/ If you could ask her what she would want/ Would she want to be away from you?"
- "Your Pretty Baby" by The 77s (1984)
  A song about a woman getting an abortion that suggests she will come to regret it in the final verse.
- "(You're) Having My Baby" by Paul Anka (featuring Odia Coates) (1974)
  A song in which a father-to-be celebrates his partner's pregnancy, including the lyrics, "Didn't have to keep it/ Wouldn't put you through it/ You could have swept it from your life/ But you wouldn't do it."
