= Caviar (disambiguation) =

Caviar, sometimes Kaviar is, primarily, the name given to the luxury delicacy consisting of processed, salted, non-fertilized sturgeon roe.

Caviar may also refer to:

== Arts, entertainment, and media ==
- Caviar (band), United States pop rock band
  - Caviar (album), their debut album
- "Caviar", a song by Dance Gavin Dance from their 2008 album Dance Gavin Dance
- Caviar (film), Austrian comedy film
- Caviar, an anthology of short stories by Theodore Sturgeon
- Kaviar, the German coprophiliac genre of pornographic movie

== Biology ==
- Green caviar, green edible algae

== Brands and enterprises ==
- Caviar, a brand of consumer hard drives produced by Western Digital
- Caviar, a third-party restaurant delivery company owned by DoorDash
- Caviar, a luxury handmade mobile phones manufacturer

== Food ==
- Snail caviar, the eggs of edible land snails or escargot

== See also ==
- Black Caviar (horse), an Australian racehorse
- Caviar lime, a nickname for the Australian finger lime plant Citrus australasica, which produces edible fruit
- Caviar spoon, a utensil for eating caviar
- Caviar tongue, condition characterized by purplish venous ectasias on the tongue
- Gauche caviar, French political term meaning "Caviar left", i.e., a champagne socialist
- Texas caviar, a salad of black-eyed peas lightly pickled in a vinaigrette-style dressing
- Smörgåskaviar, a Swedish sandwich spread in the form of a paste made from cod roe
