= Bibliography of Vladimir Putin =

This is a select bibliography of academic level books and journal articles about the history of Vladimir Putin and the historical context of his life.

Vladimir Vladimirovich Putin (Note: /ˈpuːtɪn/ POO-tin; Russian: Владимир Владимирович Путин, pronounced [vlɐˈdʲimʲɪr vlɐˈdʲimʲɪrəvʲɪtɕ ˈputʲɪn] (Note: In this name that follows East Slavic naming customs, the patronymic is Vladimirovich and the family name is Putin.)) (born 7 October 1952) is a Russian politician and former intelligence officer who has served as president of Russia since 2012, having previously held the office from 2000 to 2008. He also served as prime minister from 1999 to 2000 (Note: Putin took office as prime minister on 9 August 1999 and concurrently served as acting president from 31 December 1999 to 7 May 2000, when he was inaugurated as president.) and again from 2008 to 2012. (Note: Putin was widely regarded as the de facto leader of Russia between 2008 and 2012; see Medvedev–Putin tandemocracy.) Putin has been described as the de facto leader of Russia since 1999.

Bibliography contains academic level English language books (including translations) and journal articles, published mainly post World War II. (Note: Works published before World War II should be limited to areas where there is no significant post World War II books on the subject or when the work in question has significant historical merit.) Book entries may have references to reviews published in academic journals or major newspapers when these could be considered helpful. These reference reviews also function as a resource to find other works on this subject.

Works listed here are cited in the notes or bibliographies of scholarly sources. Each meets at least one of these tests: publication by an academic or major trade press, authorship by a recognized expert, or substantial review in scholarly journals; borderline cases are omitted. A selection of primary sources are included. Many of the books below carry their own bibliographies; see Further reading section for longer ones, and External links section for historical sites and museums.

Citations follow APA style. (Note: Entries are in plain text APA 7 format without templates; templates are used only for reviews and notes.) Book have citations to academic journal or mainstream published reviews when available. For books only partly about the subject, give relevant chapter or section titles where useful and available. Translators of the original-language edition are included when possible. In cases where a title or name has appeared with more than one English spelling, use the most recent published form is used and a footnote documents any earlier title under which the work appeared.

== Biography ==
- Galeotti, M. (2019). We need to talk about Putin: How the West gets him wrong. Ebury Press.
- Gessen, M. (2012). The man without a face: The unlikely rise of Vladimir Putin. Riverhead Books.
- Hill, F., & Gaddy, C. G. (2015). Mr. Putin: Operative in the Kremlin (New and expanded ed.). Brookings Institution Press.
- Judah, B. (2013). Fragile empire: How Russia fell in and out of love with Vladimir Putin. Yale University Press. doi:10.12987/9780300185256
- Lynch, A. C. (2011). Vladimir Putin and Russian statecraft. Potomac Books.
- Myers, S. L. (2015). The new tsar: The rise and reign of Vladimir Putin. Alfred A. Knopf.
- Roxburgh, A. (2012). The strongman: Vladimir Putin and the struggle for Russia. I.B. Tauris. doi:10.5040/9780755619856
- Sakwa, R. (2004). Putin: Russia's choice. Routledge.
- Sakwa, R. (2014). Putin redux: Power and contradiction in contemporary Russia. Routledge. doi:10.4324/9781315781037
- Sakwa, R. (2020). The Putin paradox. I.B. Tauris. doi:10.5040/9781838603700
- Short, P. (2022). Putin: His life and times. Bodley Head.
- Treisman, D. (2011). The return: Russia's journey from Gorbachev to Medvedev. Free Press.
- Van Herpen, M. H. (2013). Putinism: The slow rise of a radical right regime in Russia. Palgrave Macmillan. doi:10.1057/9781137282811
- Zygar, M. (2016). All the Kremlin's men: Inside the court of Vladimir Putin. PublicAffairs.

== Background and rise to power ==
- Baker, P., & Glasser, S. (2005). Kremlin rising: Vladimir Putin's Russia and the end of revolution. Scribner.
- Belton, C. (2020). Putin's people: How the KGB took back Russia and then took on the West. Farrar, Straus and Giroux.
- Colton, T. J., & McFaul, M. (2003). Popular choice and managed democracy: The Russian elections of 1999 and 2000. Brookings Institution Press.
- Dawisha, K. (2014). Putin's kleptocracy: Who owns Russia?. Simon & Schuster.
- Knight, A. (2000). The enduring legacy of the KGB in Russian politics. Problems of Post-Communism, 47(4), 3–15. doi:10.1080/10758216.2000.11655889
- Sakwa, R. (2008). Putin's leadership: Character and consequences. Europe-Asia Studies, 60(6), 879–897. doi:10.1080/09668130802161132
- Shevtsova, L. (2003). Putin's Russia. Carnegie Endowment for International Peace.

== Domestic politics ==
- Colton, T. J., & Hale, H. E. (2009). The Putin vote: Presidential electorates in a hybrid regime. Slavic Review, 68(3), 473–503. doi:10.1017/s0037677900019690
- Fish, M. S. (2005). Democracy derailed in Russia: The failure of open politics. Cambridge University Press. doi:10.1017/cbo9780511791062
- Frye, T., Gehlbach, S., Marquardt, K. L., & Reuter, O. J. (2016). Is Putin's popularity real? Post-Soviet Affairs, 33(1), 1–15. doi:10.1080/1060586x.2016.1144334
- Frye, T. (2021). Weak strongman: The limits of power in Putin's Russia. Princeton University Press. doi:10.1515/9780691216980
- Gel'man, V. (2015). Authoritarian Russia: Analyzing post-Soviet regime changes. University of Pittsburgh Press.
- Gel'man, V. (2022). The politics of bad governance in contemporary Russia. University of Michigan Press. doi:10.3998/mpub.11621795
- Gill, G. (2015). Building an authoritarian polity: Russia in post-Soviet times. Cambridge University Press. doi:10.1017/cbo9781316417720
- Laruelle, M. (2020). Making sense of Russia's illiberalism. Journal of Democracy, 31(3), 115–129. doi:10.1353/jod.2020.0049
- Petrov, N., Lipman, M., & Hale, H. E. (2013). Three dilemmas of hybrid regime governance: Russia from Putin to Putin. Post-Soviet Affairs, 30(1), 1–26. doi:10.1080/1060586x.2013.825140
- Reuter, O. J. (2017). The origins of dominant parties: Building authoritarian institutions in post-Soviet Russia. Cambridge University Press. doi:10.1017/9781316761649
- Sakwa, R. (2010). The crisis of Russian democracy: The dual state, factionalism and the Medvedev succession. Cambridge University Press. doi:10.1017/cbo9780511779831
- Sharafutdinova, G. (2020). The red mirror: Putin's leadership and Russia's insecure identity. Oxford University Press. doi:10.1093/oso/9780197502938.001.0001
- Treisman, D. (2011). Presidential popularity in a hybrid regime: Russia under Yeltsin and Putin. American Journal of Political Science, 55(3), 590–609. doi:10.1111/j.1540-5907.2010.00500.x

=== Internal security and the military ===
- Fedor, J. (2011). Russia and the cult of state security: The Chekist tradition, from Lenin to Putin. Routledge.
- Galeotti, M. (2019). Russian political war: Moving beyond the hybrid. Routledge. doi:10.4324/9780429443442
- Herspring, D. R. (2006). The Kremlin and the high command: Presidential impact on the Russian military from Gorbachev to Putin. University Press of Kansas.
- Monaghan, A. (2017). Power in modern Russia: Strategy and mobilisation. Manchester University Press.
- Renz, B. (2006). Putin's militocracy? An alternative interpretation of siloviki in contemporary Russian politics. Europe-Asia Studies, 58(6), 903–924. doi:10.1080/09668130600831134
- Soldatov, A., & Borogan, I. (2010). The new nobility: The restoration of Russia's security state and the enduring legacy of the KGB. PublicAffairs.
- Soldatov, A., & Borogan, I. (2015). The red web: The struggle between Russia's digital dictators and the new online revolutionaries. PublicAffairs.
- Taylor, B. D. (2011). State building in Putin's Russia: Policing and coercion after communism. Cambridge University Press.

==== Chechnya ====
- Evangelista, M. (2002). The Chechen wars: Will Russia go the way of the Soviet Union?. Brookings Institution Press.
- Gilligan, E. (2009). Terror in Chechnya: Russia and the tragedy of civilians in war. Princeton University Press. doi:10.1515/9781400831760
- Hughes, J. (2007). Chechnya: From nationalism to jihad. University of Pennsylvania Press. doi:10.9783/9780812202311
- Kramer, M. (2005). The perils of counterinsurgency: Russia's war in Chechnya. International Security, 29(3), 5–63. doi:10.1162/0162288043467450
- Russell, J. (2005). Terrorists, bandits, spooks and thieves: Russian demonisation of the Chechens before and since 9/11. Third World Quarterly, 26(1), 101–116. doi:10.1080/0143659042000322937
- Russell, J. (2007). Chechnya: Russia's "war on terror". Routledge. doi:10.4324/9780203946664
- Sakwa, R. (Ed.). (2005). Chechnya: From past to future. Anthem Press. doi:10.7135/upo/9781843313618

=== Elections, protest and opposition ===
- Greene, S. A., & Robertson, G. B. (2019). Putin v. the people: The perilous politics of a divided Russia. Yale University Press. doi:10.12987/9780300245059
- Kulichkina, A., Righetti, N., & Waldherr, A. (2025). Protest and repression on social media: Pro-Navalny and pro-government mobilization dynamics and coordination patterns on Russian Twitter. New Media & Society, 27(9), 5433–5454. doi:10.1177/14614448241254126
- Robertson, G. B. (2011). The politics of protest in hybrid regimes: Managing dissent in post-communist Russia. Cambridge University Press. doi:10.1017/cbo9780511921209
- Smyth, R. (2020). Elections, protest, and authoritarian regime stability: Russia 2008–2020. Cambridge University Press. doi:10.1017/9781108893251

=== Media and propaganda ===
- Gorham, M. S. (2014). After newspeak: Language culture and politics in Russia from Gorbachev to Putin. Cornell University Press. doi:10.7591/cornell/9780801452628.001.0001
- Pomerantsev, P. (2014). Nothing is true and everything is possible: The surreal heart of the new Russia. PublicAffairs.
- Skillen, D. (2016). Freedom of speech in Russia: Politics and media from Gorbachev to Putin. Routledge. doi:10.4324/9781315766256
- Sykes, A. (2023). Livid about liberalism: Putin, state controlled television and Kremlin portrayals of liberalism. Russian Politics, 8(3), 331–352. doi:10.30965/24518921-00803003

=== Religion and the Orthodox Church ===
- Garrard, J., & Garrard, C. (2008). Russian Orthodoxy resurgent: Faith and power in the new Russia. Princeton University Press. doi:10.1515/9781400828999
- Shakhanova, G., & Kratochvíl, P. (2022). The patriotic turn in Russia: Political convergence of the Russian Orthodox Church and the state? Politics and Religion, 15(1), 114–141. doi:10.1017/s1755048320000620
- Soroka, G. (2022). International relations by proxy? The Kremlin and the Russian Orthodox Church. Religions, 13(3), Article 208. doi:10.3390/rel13030208

=== Gender, sexuality and traditional values ===
- Blakkisrud, H., & Kolstø, P. (Eds.). (2025). Political legitimacy and traditional values in Putin's Russia. Edinburgh University Press. doi:10.1515/9781399539029
- Kolstø, P. (2025). Family, sex, and faith. Cornell University Press. doi:10.7591/cornell/9781501779411.001.0001
- Riabov, O., & Riabova, T. (2014). The remasculinization of Russia? Problems of Post-Communism, 61(2), 23–35. doi:10.2753/ppc1075-8216610202
- Sperling, V. (2014). Sex, politics, and Putin: Political legitimacy in Russia. Oxford University Press. doi:10.1093/acprof:oso/9780199324347.001.0001

=== Law, courts and the constitution ===
- Hutcheson, D. S., & McAllister, I. (2021). Consolidating the Putin regime: The 2020 referendum on Russia's constitutional amendments. Russian Politics, 6(3), 355–376. doi:10.30965/24518921-00603004
- Sakwa, R. (2010). The dual state in Russia. Post-Soviet Affairs, 26(3), 185–206. doi:10.2747/1060-586x.26.3.185
- Solomon, P. (2005). Threats of judicial counterreform in Putin's Russia. Demokratizatsiya: The Journal of Post-Soviet Democratization, 13(3), 325–346. doi:10.3200/demo.13.3.325-346

=== Economic policy ===
- Åslund, A. (2019). Russia's crony capitalism: The path from market economy to kleptocracy. Yale University Press.
- Gaddy, C. G., & Ickes, B. W. (2013). Bear traps on Russia's road to modernization. Routledge. doi:10.4324/9780203383032
- Ledeneva, A. V. (2013). Can Russia modernise? Sistema, power networks and informal governance. Cambridge University Press.
- Miller, C. (2018). Putinomics: Power and money in resurgent Russia. University of North Carolina Press. doi:10.5149/northcarolina/9781469640662.001.0001

==== Energy politics ====
- Gustafson, T. (2012). Wheel of fortune: The battle for oil and power in Russia. Harvard University Press.
- Rutland, P. (2008). Putin's economic record: Is the oil boom sustainable? Europe-Asia Studies, 60(6), 1051–1072. doi:10.1080/09668130802180975

== Foreign policy ==
- Monaghan, A. (2016). The new politics of Russia: Interpreting change. Manchester University Press. doi:10.7765/9781784997632
- Sakwa, R. (2017). Russia against the rest: The post-Cold War crisis of world order. Cambridge University Press. doi:10.1017/9781316675885
- Stent, A. (2019). Putin's world: Russia against the West and with the rest. Twelve.

=== Relations with the West ===
- Legvold, R. (2016). Return to Cold War. Polity Press.
- McFaul, M. (2018). From Cold War to hot peace: An American ambassador in Putin's Russia. Houghton Mifflin Harcourt.
- Sakwa, R. (2008). 'New Cold War' or twenty years' crisis? Russia and international politics. International Affairs, 84(2), 241–267. doi:10.1111/j.1468-2346.2008.00702.x
- Snyder, T. (2018). The road to unfreedom: Russia, Europe, America. Crown.
- Stent, A. E. (2014). The limits of partnership: U.S.-Russian relations in the twenty-first century. Princeton University Press.
- Trenin, D. (2016). Should we fear Russia?. Polity Press.

=== Middle East ===
- Bechev, D., Popescu, N., & Secrieru, S. (Eds.). (2021). Russia rising: Putin's foreign policy in the Middle East and North Africa. I.B. Tauris. doi:10.5040/9780755636679
- Dannreuther, R. (2015). Russia and the Arab Spring: Supporting the counter-revolution. Journal of European Integration, 37(1), 77–94. doi:10.1080/07036337.2014.975990
- Dannreuther, R. (2019). Understanding Russia's return to the Middle East. International Politics, 56(6), 726–742. doi:10.1057/s41311-018-0165-x
- Freedman, R. O. (2018). From Khrushchev and Brezhnev to Putin: Has Moscow's policy in the Middle East come full circle? Contemporary Review of the Middle East, 5(2), 102–115. doi:10.1177/2347798918762197
- Kozhanov, N. (Ed.). (2022). Russian foreign policy towards the Middle East: New trends, old traditions. Hurst. doi:10.14375/np.9781787388543
- Trenin, D. (2018). What is Russia up to in the Middle East?. Polity.
- Vasiliev, A. (2018). Russia's Middle East policy: From Lenin to Putin. Routledge. doi:10.4324/9781315121826

==== Syria ====
- Adamsky, D. (2020). Russian campaign in Syria – change and continuity in strategic culture. Journal of Strategic Studies, 43(1), 104–125. doi:10.1080/01402390.2019.1668273
- Allison, R. (2013). Russia and Syria: Explaining alignment with a regime in crisis. International Affairs, 89(4), 795–823. doi:10.1111/1468-2346.12046
- Averre, D., & Davies, L. (2015). Russia, humanitarian intervention and the Responsibility to Protect: The case of Syria. International Affairs, 91(4), 813–834. doi:10.1111/1468-2346.12343
- Blanga, U. (2020). Syria–Russia and the "Arab Spring": A reassessment. Middle East Policy, 27(4), 62–82. doi:10.1111/mepo.12527
- Borshchevskaya, A. (2022). Putin's war in Syria: Russian foreign policy and the price of America's absence. I.B. Tauris. doi:10.5040/9780755634668
- Geukjian, O. (2022). The Russian military intervention in Syria. McGill-Queen's University Press. doi:10.1515/9780228009450
- Kozhanov, N. (2019). From Russia's military deployment in Syria to the Astana process. In R. Hinnebusch & A. Saouli (Eds.), The war for Syria (pp. 245–260). Routledge. doi:10.4324/9780429201967-15
- Mason, R. (2018). Russia in Syria: An unequivocal return to the Middle East? Middle East Policy, 25(4), 101–115. doi:10.1111/mepo.12381
- Notte, H. (2016). Russia in Chechnya and Syria: Pursuit of strategic goals. Middle East Policy, 23(1), 59–74. doi:10.1111/mepo.12174

==== Israel ====
- Freedman, R. O. (2014). Israel and Russia: Jerusalem and its relations with Moscow under Putin. In C. Shindler (Ed.), Israel and the world powers. I.B. Tauris. doi:10.5040/9780755611522.ch-006
- Magen, Z. (2019). Russia and Israel. In R. O. Freedman (Ed.), Israel under Netanyahu (pp. 262–272). Routledge. doi:10.4324/9780429342349-14
- Melamedov, G. (2018). Putin and the Iranian–Israeli conflict. Israel Journal of Foreign Affairs, 12(2), 163–178. doi:10.1080/23739770.2018.1525655
- Rakov, D. (2024). Israel and Russia. In J. Peters & R. Geist Pinfold (Eds.), Routledge handbook on Israel's foreign relations (pp. 180–192). Routledge. doi:10.4324/9781003048398-18

=== Relations with neighboring countries ===
- Grigas, A. (2016). Beyond Crimea: The new Russian empire. Yale University Press. doi:10.12987/yale/9780300214505.001.0001
- Toal, G. (2017). Near abroad: Putin, the West, and the contest over Ukraine and the Caucasus. Oxford University Press. doi:10.1093/oso/9780190253301.001.0001

==== Georgia ====
- Allison, R. (2008). Russia resurgent? Moscow's campaign to 'coerce Georgia to peace'. International Affairs, 84(6), 1145–1171. doi:10.1111/j.1468-2346.2008.00762.x
- Asmus, R. D. (2010). A little war that shook the world: Georgia, Russia, and the future of the West. Palgrave Macmillan.
- Cornell, S. E., & Starr, S. F. (Eds.). (2009). The guns of August 2008: Russia's war in Georgia. M. E. Sharpe.

==== Ukraine ====
- Allison, R. (2014). Russian "deniable" intervention in Ukraine: How and why Russia broke the rules. International Affairs, 90(6), 1255–1297. doi:10.1111/1468-2346.12170
- Charap, S., & Colton, T. J. (2018). Everyone loses: The Ukraine crisis and the ruinous contest for post-Soviet Eurasia. Routledge. doi:10.4324/9780429031571
- D'Anieri, P. (2019). Ukraine and Russia: From civilized divorce to uncivil war. Cambridge University Press. doi:10.1017/9781108657044
- Freedman, L. (2019). Ukraine and the art of strategy. Oxford University Press.
- Kuzio, T. (2017). Putin's war against Ukraine: Revolution, nationalism, and crime. CreateSpace Independent Publishing Platform.
- Marten, K. (2015). Putin's choices: Explaining Russian foreign policy and intervention in Ukraine. The Washington Quarterly, 38(2), 189–204. doi:10.1080/0163660x.2015.1064717
- Menon, R., & Rumer, E. (2015). Conflict in Ukraine: The unwinding of the post-Cold War order. MIT Press.
- Person, R., & McFaul, M. (2022). What Putin fears most. Journal of Democracy, 33(2), 18–27. doi:10.1353/jod.2022.0015
- Plokhy, S. (2023). The Russo-Ukrainian war: The return of history. W. W. Norton.
- Sakwa, R. (2015). Frontline Ukraine: Crisis in the borderlands. I.B. Tauris. doi:10.5040/9780755603756
- Wilson, A. (2014). Ukraine crisis: What it means for the West. Yale University Press.
- Wood, E. A., Pomeranz, W. E., Merry, E. W., & Trudolyubov, M. (2015). Roots of Russia's war in Ukraine. Columbia University Press. doi:10.7312/wood70453

== Putinism and philosophy ==
- Clover, C. (2016). Black wind, white snow: The rise of Russia's new nationalism. Yale University Press.
- Eltchaninoff, M. (2018). Inside the mind of Vladimir Putin (J. Ferguson, Trans.). Hurst.
- Gudkov, L. (2011). The nature of "Putinism". Russian Social Science Review, 52(6), 21–47. doi:10.1080/10611428.2011.11065455
- Hill, R. J., & Cappelli, O. (Eds.). (2010). Putin and Putinism. Routledge.
- Laruelle, M. (2021). Is Russia fascist? Unraveling propaganda East and West. Cornell University Press.
- Stoner, K. (2025). Why does Putinism endure? Dialoguing with the dictator. Political Science Quarterly. doi:10.1093/psquar/qqae125
- Taylor, B. D. (2018). The code of Putinism. Oxford University Press.

=== Nationalism and national identity ===
- Blakkisrud, H. (2016). Blurring the boundary between civic and ethnic: The Kremlin's new approach to national identity under Putin's third term. In P. Kolstø & H. Blakkisrud (Eds.), The new Russian nationalism (pp. 249–274). Edinburgh University Press. doi:10.3366/edinburgh/9781474410427.003.0010
- Goode, J. P. (2021). Patriotic legitimation and everyday patriotism in Russia's constitutional reform. Russian Politics, 6(1), 112–129. doi:10.30965/24518921-00601007
- Goode, J. P. (2025). Russian propaganda from V to Z: Projecting banal and everyday nationalism in unsettled times. Nationalities Papers, 54(2), 232–252. doi:10.1017/nps.2025.28
- Kolstø, P., & Blakkisrud, H. (Eds.). (2016). The new Russian nationalism: Imperialism, ethnicity and authoritarianism 2000–15. Edinburgh University Press. doi:10.1515/9781474410434
- Laruelle, M. (2015). Russia as a "divided nation," from compatriots to Crimea: A contribution to the discussion on nationalism and foreign policy. Problems of Post-Communism, 62(2), 88–97. doi:10.1080/10758216.2015.1010902
- Laruelle, M. (2016). Russia as an anti-liberal European civilisation. In P. Kolstø & H. Blakkisrud (Eds.), The new Russian nationalism (pp. 275–297). Edinburgh University Press. doi:10.3366/edinburgh/9781474410427.003.0011
- Tabachnik, A. (2020). Russian intervention in Ukraine: History, identity politics, and national consolidation. Nationalism and Ethnic Politics, 26(3), 299–318. doi:10.1080/13537113.2020.1792817

== Historiography and memory ==
- Malinova, O. (2018). The embarrassing centenary: Reinterpretation of the 1917 Revolution in the official historical narrative of post-Soviet Russia (1991–2017). Nationalities Papers, 46(2), 272–289. doi:10.1080/00905992.2017.1386639
- McGlynn, J. (2023). Memory makers: The politics of the past in Putin's Russia. Bloomsbury Academic. doi:10.5040/9781350280793
- Sherlock, T. (2016). Russian politics and the Soviet past: Reassessing Stalin and Stalinism under Vladimir Putin. Communist and Post-Communist Studies, 49(1), 45–59. doi:10.1016/j.postcomstud.2016.01.001
- Wood, E. A. (2011). Performing memory: Vladimir Putin and the celebration of World War II in Russia. The Soviet and Post-Soviet Review, 38(2), 172–200. doi:10.1163/187633211x591175

== Primary sources ==
- Putin, V. (1999). Mineral raw materials resources in the strategy of progress of the Russian economy. Journal of Mining Institute, 144, 3–9.
- Putin, V., Gevorkyan, N., Timakova, N., & Kolesnikov, A. (2000). First person: An astonishingly frank self-portrait by Russia's president (C. A. Fitzpatrick, Trans.). PublicAffairs.
- Putin, V., Shestakov, V., & Levitsky, A. (2004). Judo: History, theory, practice. North Atlantic Books.
- Putin, V. (2005). Russia at the turn of the millennium. In T. Shakleina (Ed.), Russian foreign policy in transition (pp. 221–234). Central European University Press. doi:10.1515/9789633863909-021 (Original work published 1999)
- Putin, V. (2013, September 12). A plea for caution from Russia. The New York Times.
- Putin, V. (2020, June 18). The real lessons of the 75th anniversary of World War II. The National Interest.
- Putin, V. (2021, July 12). On the historical unity of Russians and Ukrainians. President of Russia.

== See also ==
- Domestic policy of Vladimir Putin
- Family of Vladimir Putin
- Foreign policy of Vladimir Putin
- Public image of Vladimir Putin
- Putinism
- Russia under Vladimir Putin
- Russo-Georgian War
- Russo-Ukrainian war
- Russo-Ukrainian war (2022–present)
