= Caviar tongue =

- Other names: Sublingual varicosities or Sublingual varices
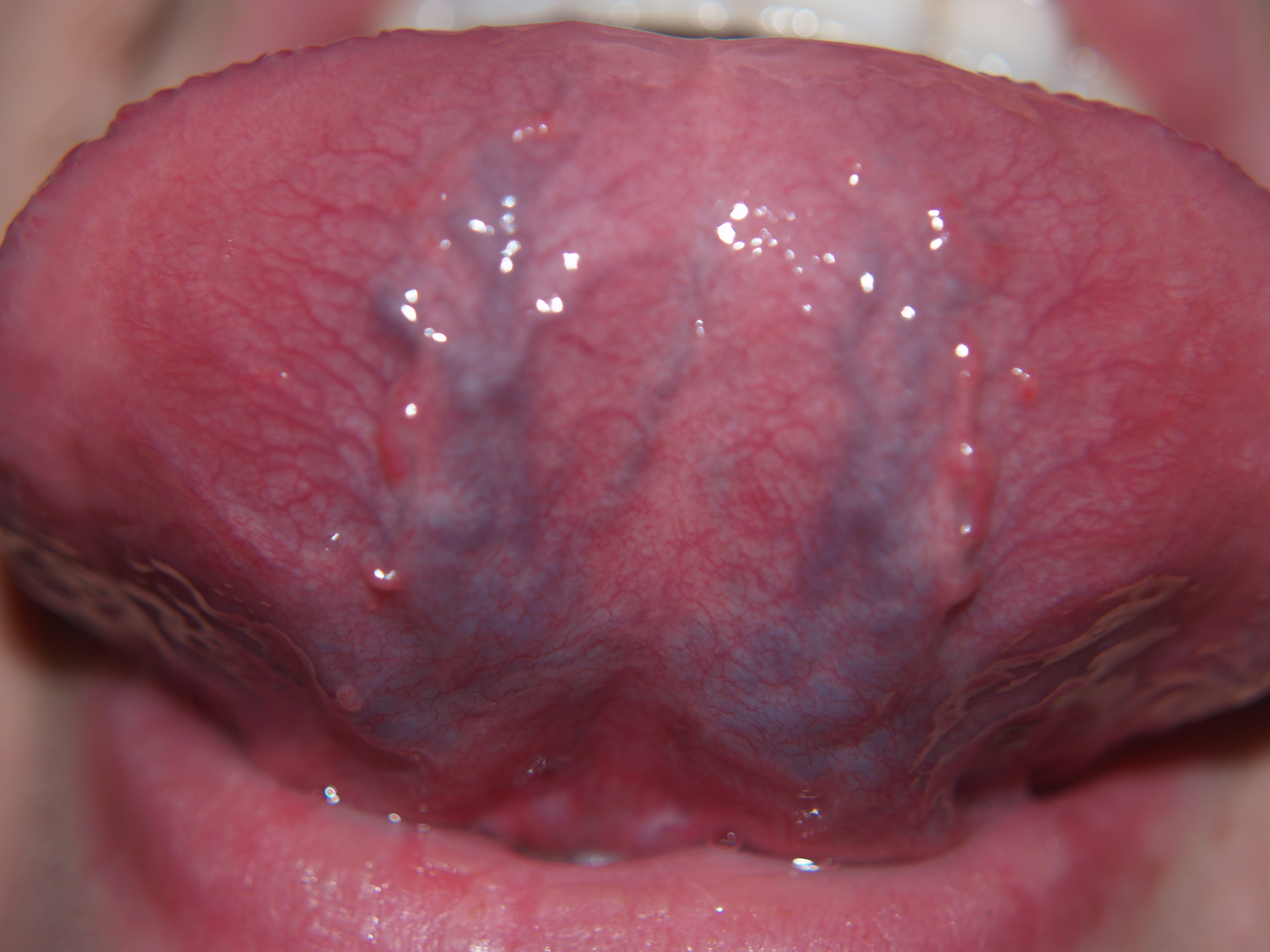
- Normal appearance of the undersurface of the tongue, showing prominent veins

Caviar tongue is a condition characterized by the purplish nodular swelling of veins found on the undersurface of the tongue.

It is normal for there to be veins visible underneath the tongue, partly because the mucous membrane is so thin and translucent in this region, but where these vessels become dilated and tortuous, they may appear round and black like caviar. Caviar tongue is also referred to as sublingual varices (plural) and varix (singular) and look like varicose veins in the tongue. It is a benign, asymptomatic, venous lesion.

== History ==
It was first described by William Bennett Bean in 1952, when he thought it looked like caviar.

== See also ==
- Varicose veins
- Varices
