= Uncle Vova, we are with you =

Russian jingoistic song

External videos
- Anna Kuvychko and schoolchildren singing

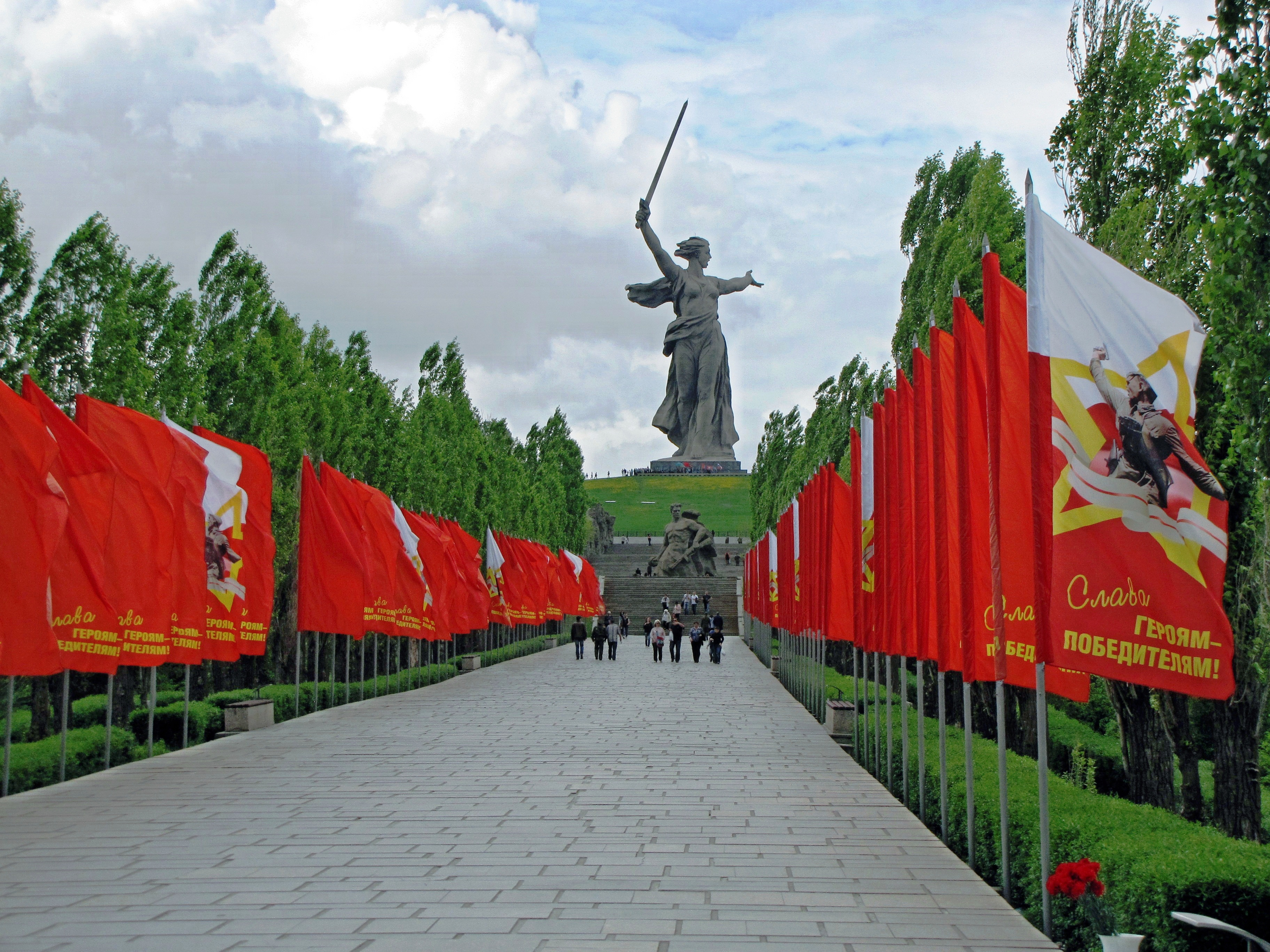
A view at the place where the song was performed

Uncle Vova, we are with you! (Russian: Дядя Вова, мы с тобой!, romanized: Dyadya Vova, my s toboy) is a Russian jingoistic song written to be performed by young children authored (both lyrics and music) by self-taught musician Vyacheslav Antonov. In May 2017, he had published a video of him singing it with his young son. In November 2017 the song gained the notoriety when a video was popularized in which Anna Kuvychko, then a State Duma deputy, performed this song with the schoolchildren in military-style uniforms of the cadet class of Volgograd school no. 44, joining a long list of songs praising Vladimir Putin. It was performed on the background of the World War II memorial The Motherland Calls.

The song included such lyrics as "While there should be peace on Earth, if the commander in chief calls us to the final battle, Uncle Vova, we are with you!" and "Sevastopol and Crimea are ours. We'll preserve them for our children. We will return Alaska to the harbor of the motherland." The song was met with praise by Russian nationalists, but also with criticism both in Russia and abroad for its politicization of children.
