= Diary of an Unborn Child =

Anti-abortion article

Diary of an Unborn Child is the title of an anonymously-written anti-abortion article which was first read on the floor of the New York Senate in 1970. The article reappeared in 1980, and was turned into a song in 2005.

== Timeline of the article ==
The original Diary of an Unborn Child was read on the floor of the New York State Senate by Republican Senate Majority Leader Earl W. Brydges on 11 April 1970. The New York Senate eventually struck down the state abortion law (31-26) in spite of Senator Brydges efforts.

The next appearance of this article was in 1980 when the article was published by the Watch Tower Bible and Tract Society in the 22 May 1980 issue of its Awake! magazine. Written in the first person, it is formatted to read as the "diary" of a fetus, chronicling the process of fetal development from an in-utero perspective, beginning with conception on 2 October and ending in an induced abortion on 28 December. The piece is intended to make readers reconsider their position on the morality of abortion.

The article was adapted into the song Diary of an Unborn Child by Mark Fox released on his album Lil' Markie Volume 1. The chorus (words and music) at the end are written by Rick and Rosemary Wilhelm. The song is sung from the point of view of a male fetus in utero, from his conception to his abortion. In between, the fetus's character chronicles his development. The fetus's character expresses, among other things:

- excitement to see the real world
- a desire to be named "Andy" (with comments that the parents, not knowing the gender, are probably using the name "Barbara")
- a desire to meet his mother

Reactions to this song have been divided. Some in the anti-abortion movement use the song, or minor variations of it, as justification for their policies. However, the song, and Fox's work in general, has arguably gained most of its recognition in the pro-choice blogosphere, where people often post it as an unintentionally amusing form of black humor or camp. The Diary of an Unborn Child has also been played as a recurring audio clip in comedy podcasts, such as Distorted View Daily.

== In popular culture ==
Segments of the diary are read aloud in the 2021 film Roe v. Wade.
