= Caviar (company) =

Luxury handmade mobile phones manufacturer

Lux Trading Corporation
- Type: Privately held company
- Industry: Telecommunications
- Founded: 2010
- Headquarters: Nizhny Novgorod, Dubai
- Number of locations: 5
- Area served: Worldwide
- Products: Luxury mobile phones

Caviar (official name Lux Trading Corporation LLC.) is a manufacturer and retailer of luxury handmade mobile phones and other consumer devices, especially from Apple.

== Description ==
Caviar started as a company founded in the early 2010s at Nizhny Novgorod, in Russia. In April 2011 it released their first luxury handmade smartphone and began to specialize into the sector by using gold, diamonds, natural leather, carbon, jewelry enamel and even some special things, like pieces of real meteorites or some other real and rare artifacts.

During the 2010s the company received growing attention from the mass media, seen as a company like Vertu but specialized from the beginning in customizing modern Smartphones, especially the ones from Apple. It has although always been linked to Russia and even to Putin (in October 2016, the company produced a limited series of iPhone 7 made from Damascus steel, featuring a golden bas-relief portrait of Putin.).

Among the customers, there are Marques Brownlee, Alexander Ovechkin, Lewis Hilsenteger and many others.

In April 2022, following the Russian invasion of Ukraine, the company split into two different ones, the Caviar Russia for the home market and the Caviar International (based in Dubai), for the rest of the world. The two companies are quite completely independent one of each other, although there are some partial collaboration in some study and project.

== See also ==
- Vertu
