= Takogo, kak Putin! =

Song by Poyushchie vmeste
- Language: Russian
- English title: "A man like Putin"
- Released: 2002
- Genre: Europop
- Length: 3:15
- Composers: Alexander Yelin, Kirill Kalashnikov
- Lyricist: Alexander Yelin
- Producer: Nikolai Gastello

"Takogo, kak Putin!" (Russian: Такого, как Путин!; lit. "One like Putin"; commonly translated as "A man like Putin") is a 2002 Russian propaganda pop song written by Alexander Yelin (Александр Елин) and performed by the all-girl band Poyushchie vmeste. The song, written during the first term of Russian president Vladimir Putin (2000–2004), sarcastically idealises Putin; however, contrary to the song's satirical intentions, the song was officially used by Putin's 2004 re-election campaign, and the satirical undertones were largely unnoticed and ignored by the Russian populace. The song was a one-hit wonder and is considered one of the most notable songs in the cult of personality surrounding Putin.

== Origin ==
Alexander Yelin, a musician known for his work with the Soviet/Russian heavy metal band Aria, wrote the composition and lyrics for the song based on a cynical $300 bet that he would be able to make a popular hit with the right message and without a large budget. (Note: PBS (2011) reports a $300 bet, while WLRN-TV (2015) places the value at $200; this discrepancy can be attributed to fluctuations in currency exchange values.) Yelin viewed Putin as the biggest and most admirable generator of news on television, and thus would be the best subject of a song. However, Yelin believed that a mere song of praise for Putin wouldn't necessarily attain success, seeking instead to write a song that not a single broadcaster would refuse to play, and came up with the idea that the song should be about a man who drinks, fights, and treats his partner poorly, leading her to separate from him and instead desire a man like Putin, who is strong and honest. Yelin assumed that the average Russian woman would like a man like Putin, and found inspiration from the attitude of young women towards the new president, choosing to portray him akin to a pop star. The singers were written to represent the everyday Russian girl who is surrounded by men who are "drunk, filthy and mean", in a manner similar to an earlier work by Yekaterina Semyonova in the 1980s who sings about a man who "neither drinks, nor smokes, and always gives flowers" (Чтоб не пил, не курил и цветы всегда дарил).

The song was produced by Nikolai V. Gastello (grandson of Nikolai Frantsevich Gastello), who at the time was head of the press department of the Supreme Court of Russia, but also worked in the music industry. Gastello, an ideological individual, wanted to establish a pop band that would express positive feelings about Russia and rid Russian pop music of "depression and decadence". He founded the pop group Poyushchie vmeste, alongside singers Larisa Lychina, Irina Kozlova and Yana Kozlova, and used his music industry contacts to get the song played on the radio.

== Release ==
Такого, как Путин, полного сил,
Такого, как Путин, чтобы не пил.
Такого, как Путин чтоб не обижал,
Такого, как Путин, чтоб не убежал.

I want a man like Putin, who's full of strength
I want a man like Putin, who doesn't drink
I want a man like Putin, who won't make me sad
I want a man like Putin, who won't run away

— Chorus of "Takogo, kak Putin!" (2002) by Poyushchie vmeste, with English translation by PBS

The song was initially only broadcast on radio (on channels such as Russkoye Radio, Dynamite FM, and AvtoRadio), and was not available for purchase. Vladimir Putin himself stated that he did not feel offended by the song, whereupon the song began playing on state radio stations. Since the origin of the song was initially not well known, suspicions were raised that the song was created as part of official Russian propaganda. In 2004, CD Land Records released an album featuring the song, among other tracks.

In 2004, the band Poyushchie vmeste split up, eventually reuniting in 2015 with a new line-up featuring much younger singers, and releasing a newly re-recorded version of "Takogo, kak Putin!".

=== Music video ===
The video was played on MTV Rossiya as the song placed high in the charts. Putin lookalike Anatoly Gorbunov was cast for the music video of the song. In the video, Gastello plays an advisor to Putin, with whom he reviews a video featuring the performing singers, who dance seductively in front of an animated Russian flag, moving similarly to Bond girls in the opening sequences of James Bond films. The Putin lookalike is portrayed akin to a master spy, making parallels with James Bond, considered a masculine and worldly figure in popular culture, traits which should translate to Putin. Video snippets of the real-world Putin from state media are shown as inserts, including footage of Putin in the cockpit of a fighter jet, practising Judo, and performing presidential duties.

== Reception ==
The song was written two years after Putin's inauguration, riding the wave of Russia's euphoria for a new president who bore nationwide expectations that he would lead the country forward. Although Putin was sarcastically portrayed in the song as an ideal man, the song was not taken satirically, and Putin even used the song as a promotional anthem at events and rallies, with the song becoming appropriated for state purposes. The song saw its greatest success and popularity in late 2007 and early 2008.

It features a catchy trance beat, is short in duration, and consists of two easily memorable verses. The verses are made up of an ABAB rhyme scheme with impure rhymes in the B-line, while the chorus has an AABB rhyme scheme. Putin's name is mentioned very frequently throughout the song lyrics; in the first stanza, the woman separates from her boyfriend, while the second stanza describes how she sees Putin on the news and concludes that she would be better off with a man like Putin. Putin's cult of personality is largely influenced by television depictions and Russia's conflict with the West; the woman's leap from news to private life is abrupt, with Putin saying on television what the populace wants to hear and admire. Ergo, the song is about a woman who has found her personal ideal, and is not a song about the president.

Initially, listeners in Russia did not know whether the song expressed humour, admiration, melancholy, or whether it was orchestrated PR. However, the song became so popular that an official English version titled "You Must Be Like Putin" was also recorded and included as the eleventh track of the 2004 album.

== Use in politics ==
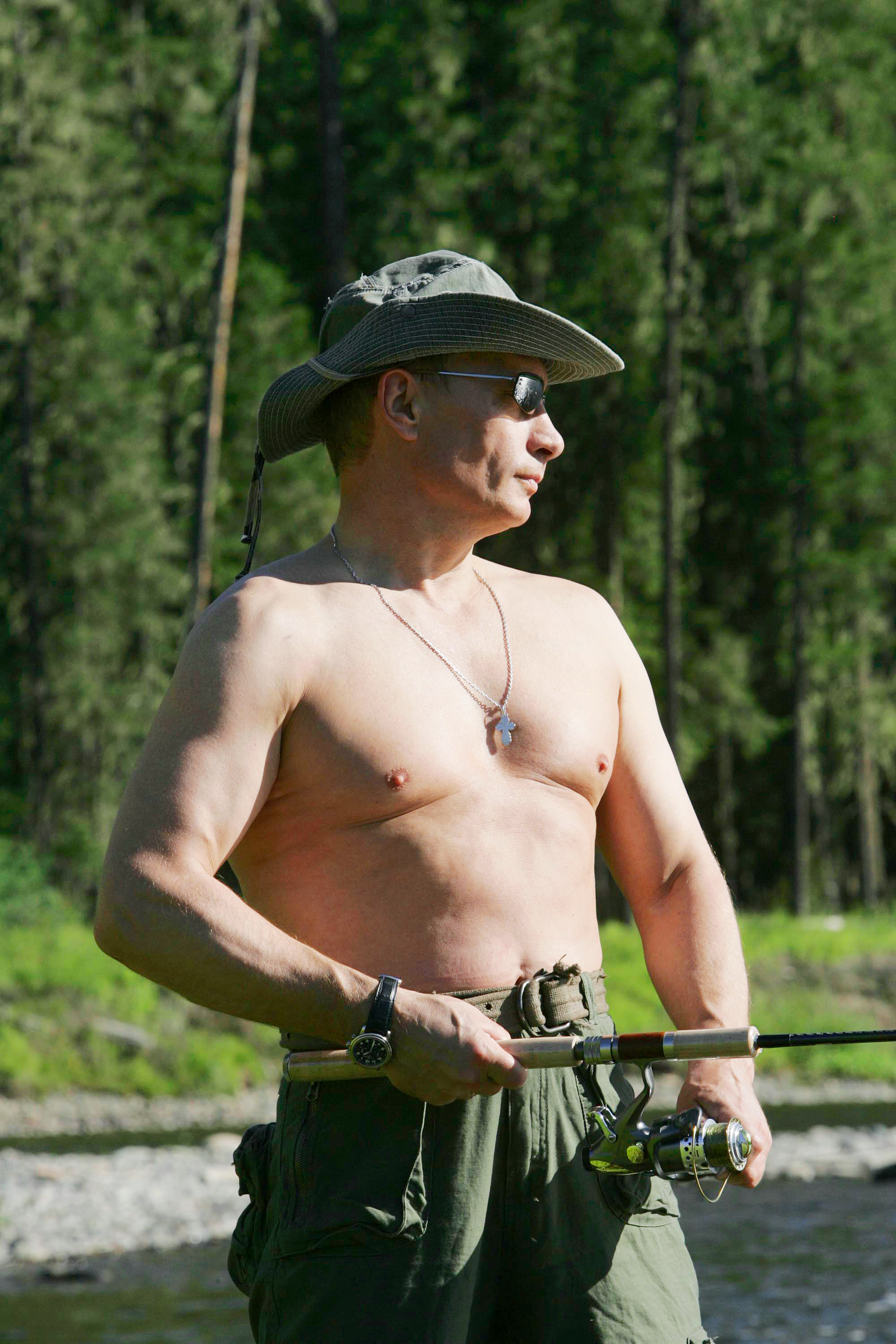
Putin fishing in Tuva, 2007. Putin often presents himself as a masculine figure in Russian media.

Although earlier Soviet leaders were often portrayed as strong leaders in Soviet agitprop, the media depiction of Vladimir Putin differs in that such portrayals aim to make him appear "cool". The propagandistic portrayal of Putin in Russian media stems from the ideologue Vladislav Surkov; Putin, who neither smokes nor drinks, was built up as a virile bearer of hope, in contrast to the likes of Boris Yeltsin. Putin's image is that of a strong, masculine man, but also purged of vices commonly attributed to men in Russia, such as drunkenness, smoking and recklessness. The song was especially successful with women in Russia, to whom his abstinence from alcohol is considered particularly admirable. Putin is portrayed in the song as desirable for women and as a role model for men, corresponding to the desire in Russia for a strong leader; the idea that men like Putin do not run away can be associated with Putin's hardline response to the 1999 Russian apartment bombings, while the improvement of living conditions in Russia during his presidency allude to Putin being a saviour or protector. The song popularised Putin as a symbol of true Russian masculinity and featured an undertone which carried Putin's political leadership.

The lyrics "I want a man like Putin, who won't run away" were interpreted by Russian women especially as a metaphor for Putin's marital fidelity, thus representing a father and role-model figure who is both competent and benevolent. Later in 2008, while addressing his extramarital affair, Putin said that he "liked all Russian women", who were the "most beautiful in the world"; his 2014 divorce did not affect Putin's approval ratings, and rumours of his newfound fatherhood were seen as proof of the then-60 year old's physical health.

Putin's name occurs ten times within the lyrics, which consists of 108 words, thereby taking up 9.259% of all words used. The primary vocalists emphasise the first syllable of the name, while the background singers emphasise the second syllable, giving the name a double stress, and the refrain is repeated five times. The statement "He must be like Putin" expresses to the audience that they need Putin, or that they should be like him, with no additional justification being given. The message is that Putin is universally capable of providing assistance in all circumstances where he is called upon; the incompleteness of the message makes listeners believe that they will choose Putin on their own accord, and benefits Putin as voters do not feel directly manipulated.

In 2002, the song was viewed as bizarre propaganda among Western media outlets, and its ironic undertones were overlooked, as was the case within Russia. In the West, the song represented a contradictory perception of Putin, on the one hand a mysterious former KGB agent, while on the other hand a cartoony, bare-chested macho man chasing after votes. Phrases like "One like Putin" have been used by the pro-government youth organisation Nashi to recruit members, in reference to the song. Sergei Buntman, founder of Echo of Moscow, believes that the song plays into Putin's control over the media, using popular songs for internal propaganda to gain and maintain support for his policies, and to increase popular confidence in his government. Without clear political programs that can be assigned to specific parties, voters in Russia often orient themselves towards well-known individuals, and voters find it difficult to express their political will among a low political culture; as a result, voters rely on a large extent on their feelings to determine their sympathy or antipathy towards a certain politician, and advertising through catchy musical earworms plays a major role in influencing such feelings.

In the midst of the 2011–2013 Russian protests, Alexander Yelin released the anti-Putin song "Nash durdom golosuyet za Putina" (Наш дурдом голосует за Путина; lit. "Our madhouse votes for Putin") with the musical group Rabfaq (Рабфак), at the request of an opposition party politician; the lyrics are set from the point of view of a psychiatric patient whose insanity arises from Putin's rhetoric and what the patient sees. Thus, the most famous pro-Putin song and the then-most famous anti-Putin song were written by the same composer; Yelin had also been notably dissatisfied with the aloof appropriation of "Takogo, kak Putin!".
