= Singing Together =

Russian electro dance group

Poyushchie vmeste (Russian: Поющие вместе, lit. 'Singing Together') is a Russian electro dance band, whose song "Takogo kak Putin", a satirical song about Vladimir Putin, was a hit across Russia. It topped the Russian Music Charts in 2002. The genesis of this song was covered in the documentary "Sound Tracks: Music Without Borders", made by the Talbot Players. Band members are Yana Dayneko (sister of Victoria Dayneko) and Irina Kozlova.
