= Political positions of Vladimir Putin =

The political positions of Vladimir Putin can refer to:

- Domestic policy of Vladimir Putin
- Foreign policy of Vladimir Putin

and also, more broadly:

- Russia under Vladimir Putin
- Political career of Vladimir Putin
