= Political career of Vladimir Putin =

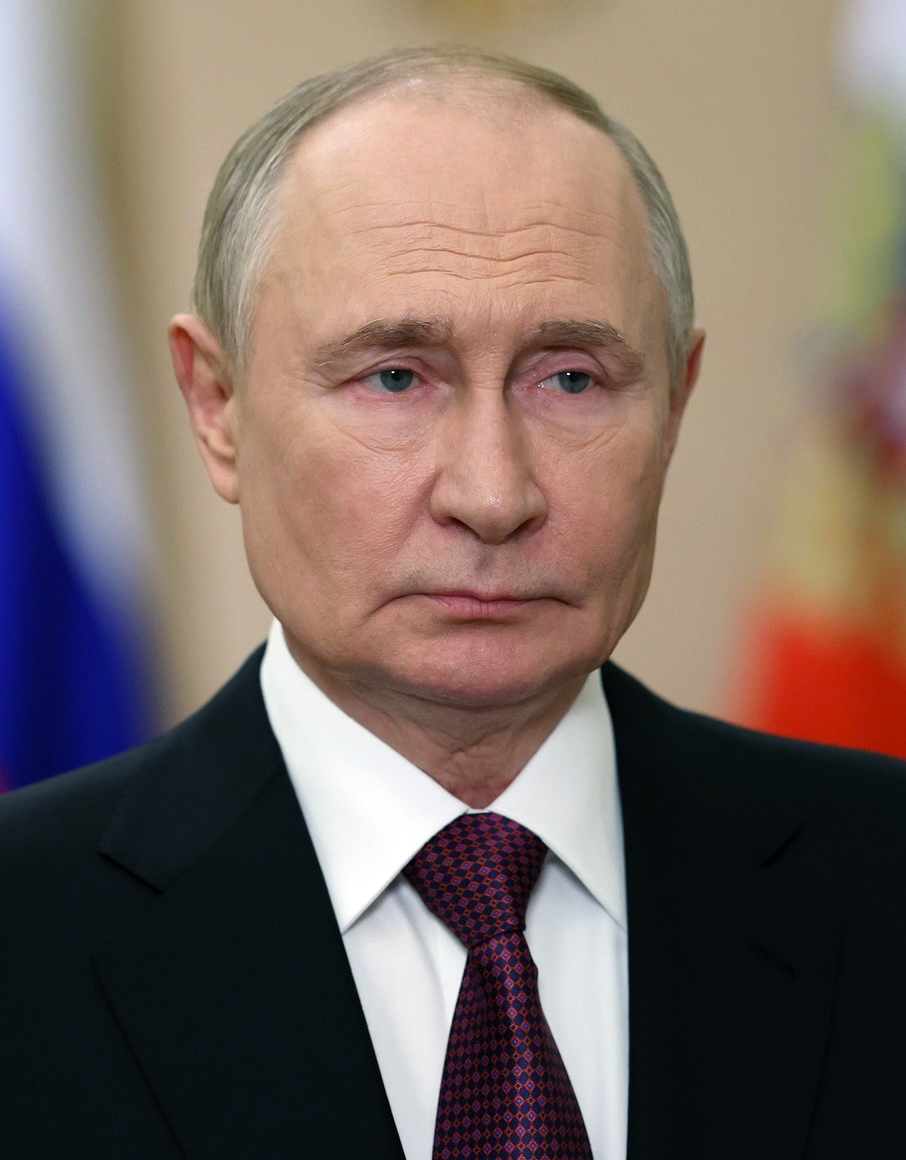
Putin in 2025

The political career of Vladimir Putin concerns the career of Vladimir Putin in politics, including his current tenure as President of Russia. Putin's career has evolved from early administrative roles in Saint Petersburg to national security leadership and long-standing presidency.

His political rise began in the Saint Petersburg City Administration (1990–1997), where in May 1990 he was appointed as an advisor on international affairs to Mayor Anatoly Sobchak. Shortly thereafter, in June 1991, he became the head of the Committee for External Relations of the Saint Petersburg Mayor’s Office, overseeing the promotion of international ties, foreign investment, and the registration of business ventures. Though his tenure was marred by investigations from the city legislative council concerning discrepancies in asset valuation and the export of metals, Putin retained his position until 1996. During the mid-1990s, he expanded his responsibilities in Saint Petersburg, serving as first deputy head of the city administration and leading the local branch of the pro-government political party Our Home Is Russia, as well as participating in advisory roles with regional newspapers.

Transitioning to the national scene in 1996, Putin was called to Moscow following the electoral defeat of Sobchak, where he assumed the role of Deputy Chief of the Presidential Property Management Department. In this capacity, he was responsible for managing the transfer of former Soviet assets to the Russian Federation. His career in Moscow advanced rapidly with his appointment in 1997 as deputy chief of the Presidential Staff and later as chief of the Main Control Directorate of the same department. A pivotal moment came in 1998 when President Boris Yeltsin appointed him director of the FSB, Russia’s primary intelligence and security agency. In this role, Putin concentrated on reorganising and strengthening the agency after years of perceived decline, a period that would prove formative for his later approach to governance.

In August 1999, Putin’s profile increased substantially when he was named one of the three first deputy prime ministers, and later the acting prime minister following the dismissal of Sergei Stepashin's Cabinet. Endorsed by Yeltsin as his preferred successor, Putin quickly capitalised on his law-and-order reputation and rose in popularity, winning the presidential election in March 2000 and being inaugurated on 7 May 2000. Throughout his subsequent terms, alternately serving as president and prime minister, Putin has overseen extensive reforms aimed at consolidating state power, restructuring federal relations, and curbing the influence of oligarchs. His tenure has been punctuated by significant foreign policy actions, including the controversial annexation of Crimea in 2014, military interventions in Syria, and ongoing involvement in the Russo-Ukrainian War.

== Saint Petersburg administration (1990–1997) ==
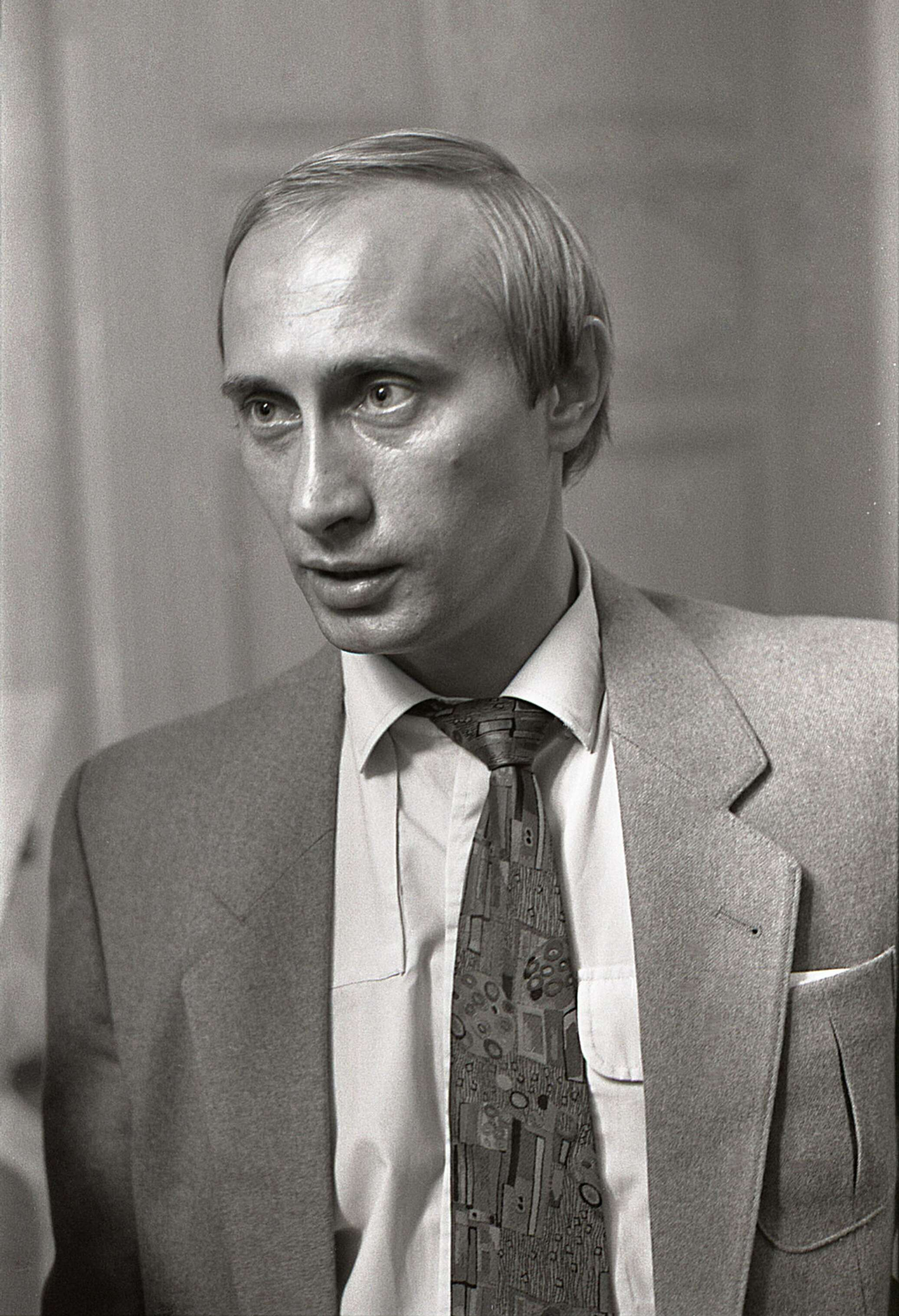
Putin as deputy mayor of Saint Petersburg, 1991

In May 1990, Putin was appointed Mayor Sobchak's advisor on international affairs. On 28 June 1991, he was appointed head of the Committee for External Relations of the Saint Petersburg Mayor's Office, with responsibility for promoting international relations and foreign investments. The Committee also registered business ventures in Saint Petersburg. Less than one year later, Putin was investigated by a commission of the city legislative council. Commission deputies Marina Salye and Yury Gladkov concluded that Putin understated prices and permitted the export of metals valued at $93 million, in exchange for foreign food aid that never arrived. Despite the commission's recommendation that Putin be fired, Putin remained head of the Committee for External Relations until 1996.

From 1994 to 1997, Putin was appointed to other positions in Saint Petersburg. In March 1994, he became first deputy head of the city administration. From 1995 through June 1997, he led the Saint Petersburg branch of the pro-government Our Home Is Russia political party. From 1995 through June 1996 he was also the head of the advisory board of the JSC Newspaper Sankt-Peterburgskie Vedomosti. Putin was a member of the Kissinger-Sobchak Commission, which was set up by Sobchak and the Center for Strategic and International Studies in Washington to promote Western investment.

== Moscow career (1996–1999) ==
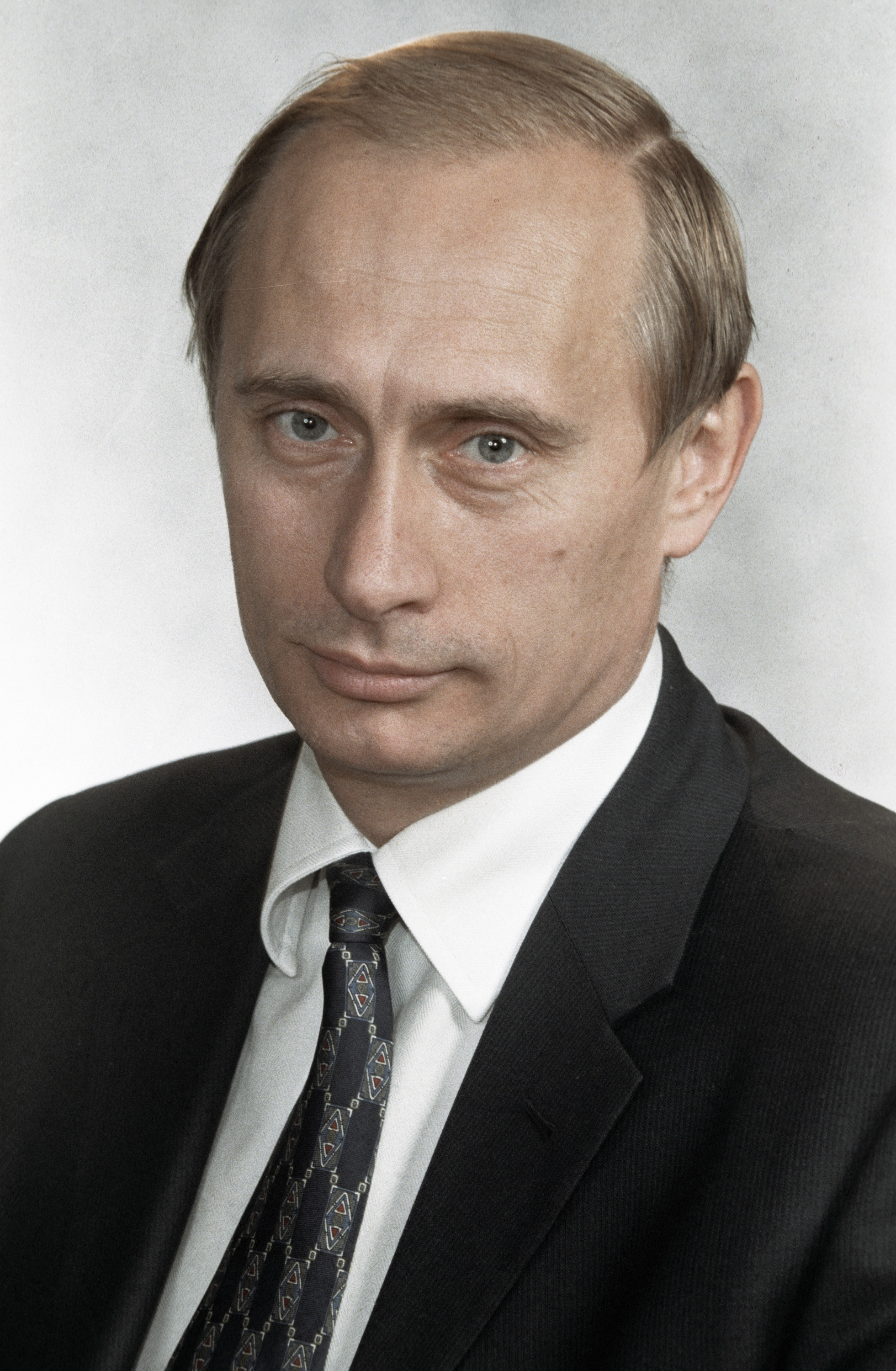
Putin as FSB director, 1998

In 1996, Anatoly Sobchak lost the Saint Petersburg mayoral election to Vladimir Yakovlev. Putin was called to Moscow and in June 1996 became a Deputy Chief of the Presidential Property Management Department headed by Pavel Borodin. He occupied this position until March 1997. During his tenure Putin was responsible for the foreign property of the state and organized transfer of the former assets of the Soviet Union and Communist Party to the Russian Federation.

On 26 March 1997, President Boris Yeltsin appointed Putin deputy chief of Presidential Staff, which he remained until May 1998, and chief of the Main Control Directorate of the Presidential Property Management Department (until June 1998). His predecessor in this position was Alexei Kudrin and the successor was Nikolai Patrushev, both future prominent politicians and Putin's associates.

On 27 June 1997, at the Saint Petersburg Mining Institute, guided by rector Vladimir Litvinenko, Putin defended his Candidate of Science (Ph.D. equal) dissertation in economics, titled "The Strategic Planning of Regional Resources Under the Formation of Market Relations". When Putin later became president, the dissertation became a target of plagiarism accusations by fellows at the Brookings Institution, Igor Danchenko and Clifford G. Gaddy; though the allegedly plagiarised study was referenced to the authors of the allegation felt sure it constituted plagiarism, though they were unsure as to whether it was "intentional"; the dissertation committee denied the accusations. In his dissertation, and in a later article published in 1999, Putin advocated the idea of so-called National champions, a concept that would later become central to his political thinking.

On 25 May 1998, Putin was appointed First Deputy Chief of Presidential Staff for regions, replacing Viktoriya Mitina; and, on 15 July, the Head of the Commission for the preparation of agreements on the delimitation of power of regions and the federal center attached to the President, replacing Sergey Shakhray. After Putin's appointment, the commission completed no such agreements, although during Shakhray's term as the Head of the Commission there were 46 agreements signed. Later, after becoming President, Putin canceled all previous delimitation agreements.

=== 1998–1999: Director of FSB ===
On 25 July 1998, Yeltsin appointed Putin director of the Federal Security Service (FSB), the primary intelligence and security organization of the Russian Federation and the successor to the KGB. Putin occupied the position until August 1999. He became a permanent member of the Security Council of Russia in October 1998 and its secretary in March 1999. During his tenure as director of the FSB, Putin focused on reorganizing and strengthening the agency, restoring its effectiveness after years of perceived decline following dissolution of the Soviet Union. This period is seen as formative in shaping his approach to governance, marked by consolidating power, suppressing dissent, controlling information, and reinforcing state security.

A week after Putin's appointment as FSB director, journalist Anatoly Levin-Utkin was murdered while investigating corruption allegations involving Putin, in what was suspected to be a targeted killing to silence dissent.

== First Premiership (1999) ==
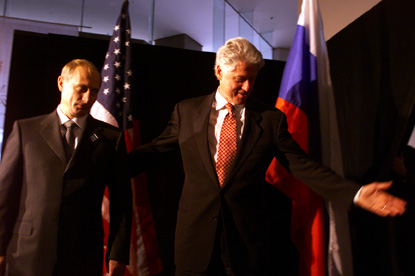
Prime Minister Putin meets with U.S. president Bill Clinton on 12 September 1999.

On 9 August 1999, Vladimir Putin was appointed one of three First Deputy Prime Ministers, which enabled him later on that day, as the previous government led by Sergei Stepashin had been sacked, to be appointed acting prime minister of the Government of the Russian Federation by President Boris Yeltsin. Yeltsin also announced that he wanted to see Putin as his successor. Later, that same day, Putin agreed to run for the presidency. On 16 August, the State Duma approved his appointment as prime minister with 233 votes in favour (vs. 84 against, 17 abstained), while a simple majority of 226 was required, making him Russia's fifth PM in fewer than eighteen months. On his appointment, few expected Putin, virtually unknown to the general public, to last any longer than his predecessors. He was initially regarded as a Yeltsin loyalist; like other prime ministers of Boris Yeltsin, Putin did not choose ministers himself, his cabinet being determined by the presidential administration.

Yeltsin's main opponents and would-be successors, Moscow mayor Yury Luzhkov and former prime minister Yevgeny Primakov, were already campaigning to replace the ailing president, and they fought hard to prevent Putin's emergence as a potential successor. Putin's law-and-order image and his unrelenting approach to the renewed crisis in the North Caucasus, which started when the Islamic International Brigade based in Chechnya invaded a neighboring region starting the War in Dagestan, soon combined to raise Putin's popularity and allowed him to overtake all rivals.

While not associated with any party, Putin pledged his support to the newly formed Unity Party, which won the second largest percentage of the popular vote (23.3%) in the December 1999 Duma elections, and in turn he was supported by it.

== Acting Presidency (1999–2000) ==
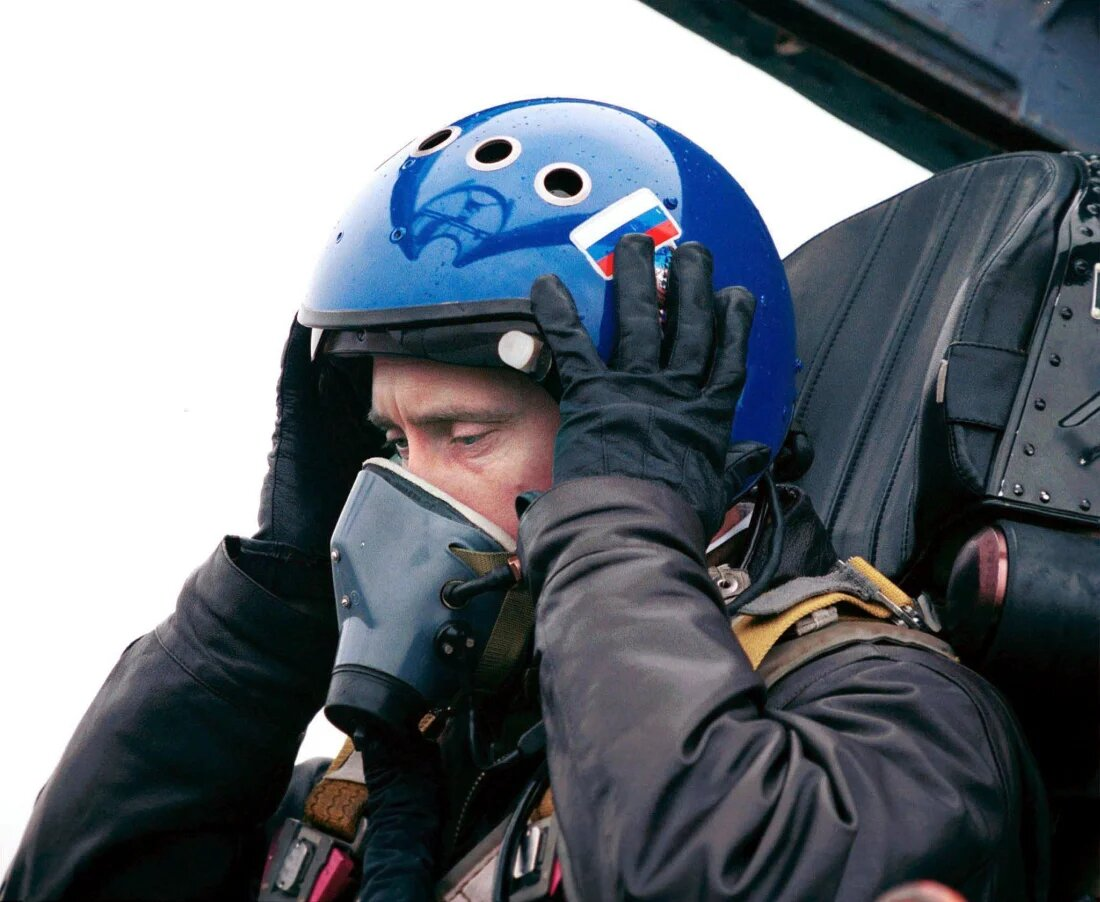
Putin landing in Grozny in a Su-27 fighter jet (20 March 2000)

On 31 December 1999, Yeltsin unexpectedly resigned and, according to the constitution, Putin became Acting President of the Russian Federation. On assuming this role, Putin went on a previously scheduled visit to Russian troops in Chechnya.

The first Presidential Decree that Putin signed, on 31 December 1999, was titled "On guarantees for former president of the Russian Federation and members of his family". This ensured that "corruption charges against the outgoing President and his relatives" would not be pursued, although this claim is not strictly verifiable. Later, on 12 February 2001, Putin signed a federal law on guarantees for former presidents and their families, which replaced the similar decree.

While his opponents had been preparing for an election in June 2000, Yeltsin's resignation resulted in the Presidential elections being held within three months, on 26 March 2000; Putin won in the first round with 53% of the vote.

== First Presidential term (2000–2004) ==
Vladimir Putin was inaugurated president on 7 May 2000. He appointed Minister of Finance Mikhail Kasyanov as his prime minister. Having announced his intention to consolidate power in the country into a strict vertical, in May 2000 he issued a decree dividing 89 federal subjects of Russia between 7 federal districts overseen by representatives of his in order to facilitate federal administration.

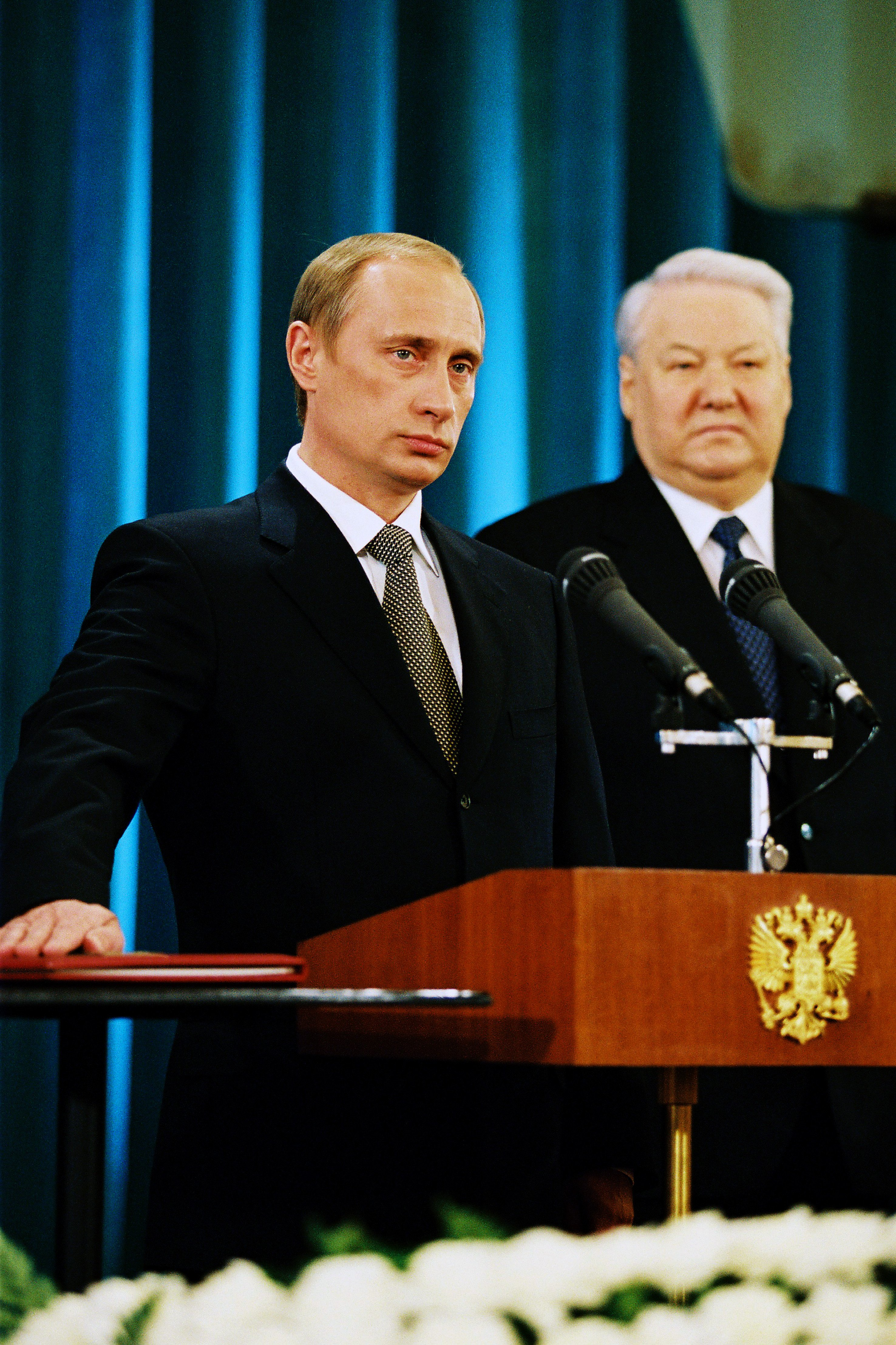
Putin taking the presidential oath with Boris Yeltsin looking on (7 May 2000)

During his first term in office, he moved to curb the political ambitions of some of the Yeltsin-era oligarchs such as former Kremlin insider Boris Berezovsky, who had "helped Mr. Putin enter the family, and funded the party that formed Mr. Putin's parliamentary base", according to a BBC profile. At the same time, according to Vladimir Solovyev, it was Alexey Kudrin who was instrumental in Putin's assignment to the Presidential Administration of Russia to work with Pavel Borodin, and according to Solovyev, Berezovsky was proposing Igor Ivanov rather than Putin as a new president.

Between 2000 and 2004, and ending following the Yukos-affair, Putin apparently won a power-struggle with the oligarchs, reaching a 'grand-bargain' with them. This bargain allowed the oligarchs to maintain most of their powers, in exchange for their explicit support and alignment with his government.

A new group of business magnates, such as Arkady Rotenberg, Igor Sechin, Gennady Timchenko, Vladimir Yakunin, Yuriy Kovalchuk, Sergey Chemezov, with close personal ties to Putin, also emerged.

Russia's legal reform continued productively during Putin's first term. In particular, Putin succeeded in the codification of land law and tax law, where progress had been slow during Yeltsin's administration, because of Communist and oligarch opposition, respectively. Other legal reforms included new codes on labour, administrative, criminal, commercial and civil procedural law, as well as a major statute on the Bar.

The first major challenge to Putin's popularity came in August 2000, when he was criticised for his alleged mishandling of the Kursk submarine disaster.

In December 2000, Putin sanctioned the law to change the National anthem of Russia. At the time, the Anthem had music by Glinka and no words. The change was to restore (with a minor modification) the music of the post-1944 Soviet anthem by Alexandrov, while the new text was composed by Sergey Mikhalkov, who previously had authored the lyrics of the two versions of the Soviet anthem.

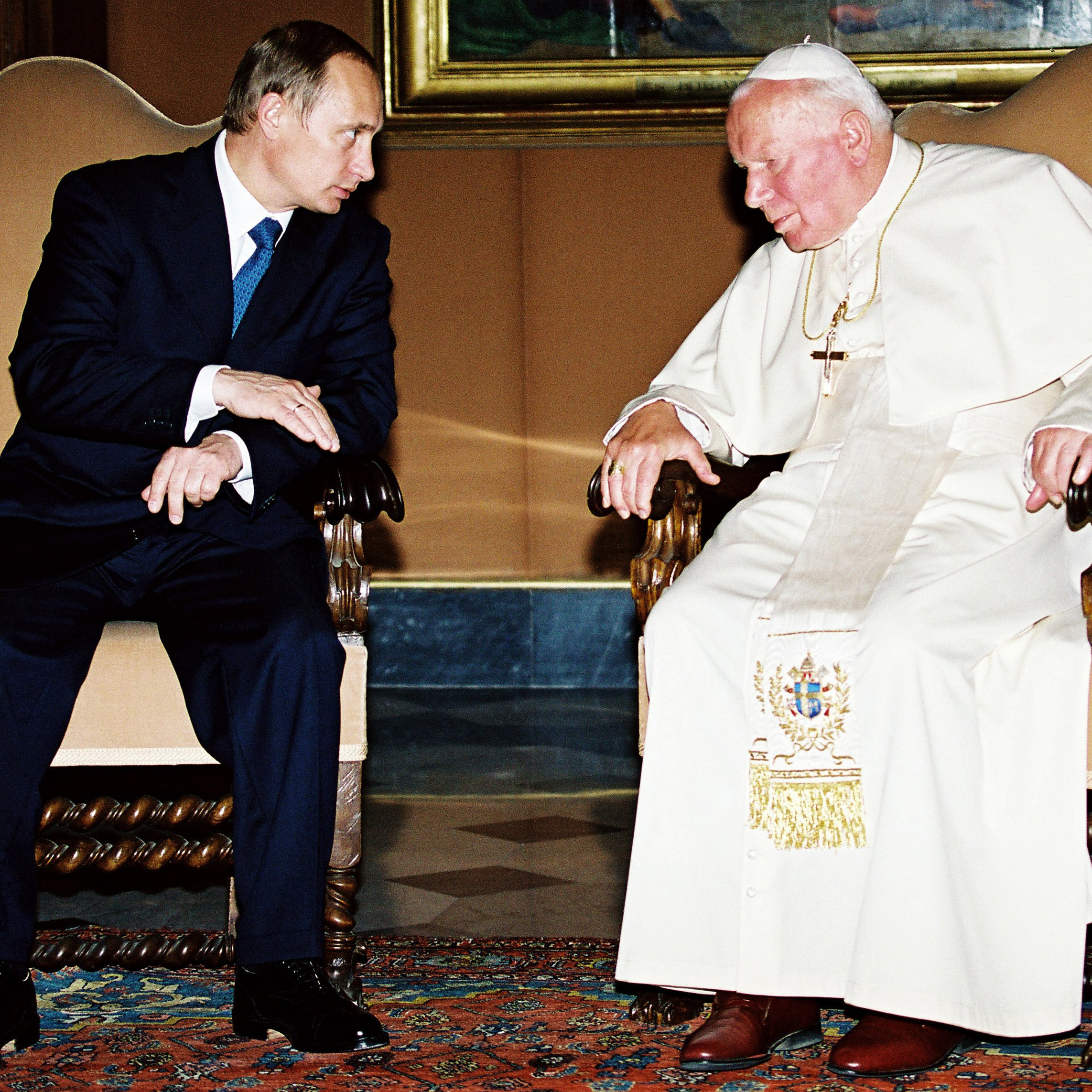
Putin with Pope John Paul II in the Vatican City (5 June 2000)

Many in the Russian press and in the international media warned that the death of some 130 hostages in the special forces' rescue operation during the 2002 Moscow theater hostage crisis would severely damage President Putin's popularity. However, shortly after the siege had ended, the Russian president was enjoying record public approval ratings – 83% of Russians declared themselves satisfied with Putin and his handling of the siege.

A few months before the elections, Putin fired Kasyanov's cabinet and appointed Mikhail Fradkov in his place. Sergei Ivanov became the first ever civilian in Russia to hold the title of defense minister.

In 2003, a referendum was held in Chechnya on the adoption of a new constitution which declares the Republic as a part of Russia. Chechnya has been gradually stabilized with the establishment of parliamentary elections and a regional government. Throughout the war, Russia had severely disabled the Chechen rebel movement, although sporadic violence continued to occur throughout the North Caucasus.

== Second Presidential term (2004–2008) ==
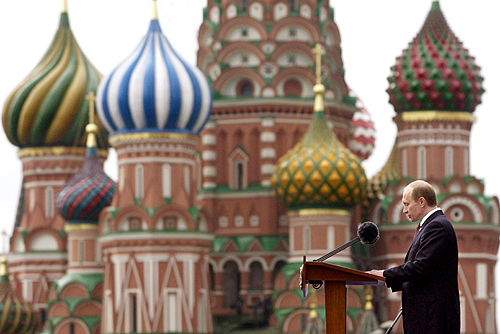
Putin speaking at the 2005 Victory Day Parade on Red Square. Saint Basil's Cathedral is in the background.

On 14 March 2004, Putin was elected to the presidency for a second term, receiving 71% of the vote.

The Beslan school hostage crisis took place in September 2004, in which hundreds died. Among the administrative measures taken after that terrorist act, Putin launched an initiative to replace the direct election of the Governors and Presidents of the Federal subjects of Russia with a system whereby they would be nominated by the President and approved or disapproved by regional legislatures. In 2005 Putin created the Public Chamber of Russia.

In 2005, the National Priority Projects were launched to improve Russia's health care, education, housing and agriculture. The most high-profile change within the national priority project frameworks was probably the 2006 across-the-board increase in wages in healthcare and education, as well as the decision to modernise equipment in both sectors in 2006 and 2007. In his May 2006 annual speech, Putin announced increasing maternity benefits and state support of prenatal care for women. By 2012, the demographic programmes of the government led to a 45% increase in second child births by women, and a 60% increase in third, fourth, etc. births.

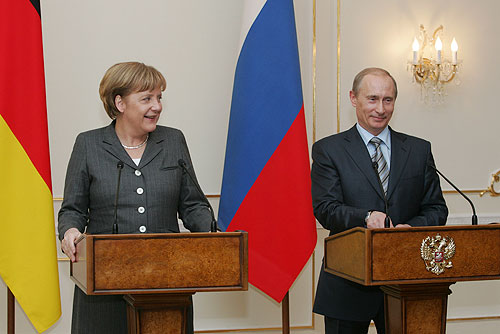
Putin with Chancellor of Germany Angela Merkel in March 2008

The continued criminal prosecution of Russia's richest man, President of YUKOS company Mikhail Khodorkovsky, for fraud and tax evasion was seen by the international press as a retaliation for Khodorkovsky's donations to both liberal and communist opponents of the Kremlin. The government said that Khodorkovsky was corrupting a large segment of the Duma to prevent tax code changes such as taxes on windfall profits and closing offshore tax evasion vehicles. Khodorkovsky was arrested, Yukos was bankrupted and the company's assets were auctioned at below-market value, with the largest share acquired by the state company Rosneft. The fate of Yukos was seen in the West as a sign of a broader shift of Russia towards a system of state capitalism.

A study by Bank of Finland's Institute for Economies in Transition (BOFIT) in 2008 found that state intervention had made a positive impact on the corporate governance of many companies in Russia: the governance was better in companies with state control or with a stake held by the government.

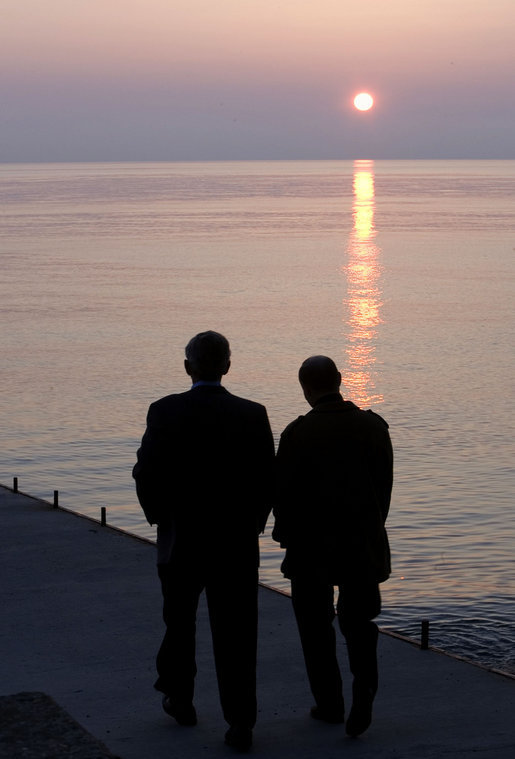
George W. Bush and Vladimir Putin take a sunset walk on a pier along the Black Sea, 5 April 2008

Putin was criticized in the West and also by Russian liberals for what many observers considered a wide-scale crackdown on media freedom in Russia. On 7 October 2006, Anna Politkovskaya, a journalist who exposed corruption in the Russian army and its conduct in Chechnya, was shot in the lobby of her apartment building. The death of Politkovskaya triggered an outcry in Western media, with accusations that, at best, Putin has failed to protect the country's new independent media. When asked about the Politkovskaya murder in his interview with the German TV channel ARD, Putin said that her murder brings much more harm to the Russian authorities than her writing. By 2012, the performers of the murder were arrested and named Boris Berezovsky and Akhmed Zakayev as a possible clients.

In 2007, "Dissenters' Marches" were organized by the opposition group The Other Russia, led by former chess champion Garry Kasparov and national-Bolshevist leader Eduard Limonov. Following prior warnings, demonstrations in several Russian cities were met by police action, which included interfering with the travel of the protesters and the arrests of as many as 150 people who attempted to break through police lines. The Dissenters' Marches have received little support among the Russian general public, according to polls.

On 12 September 2007, Putin dissolved the government upon the request of Prime Minister Mikhail Fradkov. Fradkov commented that it was to give the President a "free hand" in the run-up to the parliamentary election. Viktor Zubkov was appointed the new prime minister.

In December 2007, United Russia won 64.24% of the popular vote in their run for State Duma according to election preliminary results. United Russia's victory in the December 2007 elections was seen by many as an indication of strong popular support of the then Russian leadership and its policies.

On 8 February 2008, Putin delivered a speech before the expanded session of the State Council headlined "On the Strategy of Russia's Development until 2020". In his last days in office, Putin was reported to have taken a series of steps to re-align the regional bureaucracy to make the governors report to the prime minister rather than the president. The presidential site explained that "the changes... bear a refining nature and do not affect the essential positions of the system. The key role in estimating the effectiveness of activity of regional authority still belongs to President of the Russian Federation."

== Second Premiership (2008–2012) ==
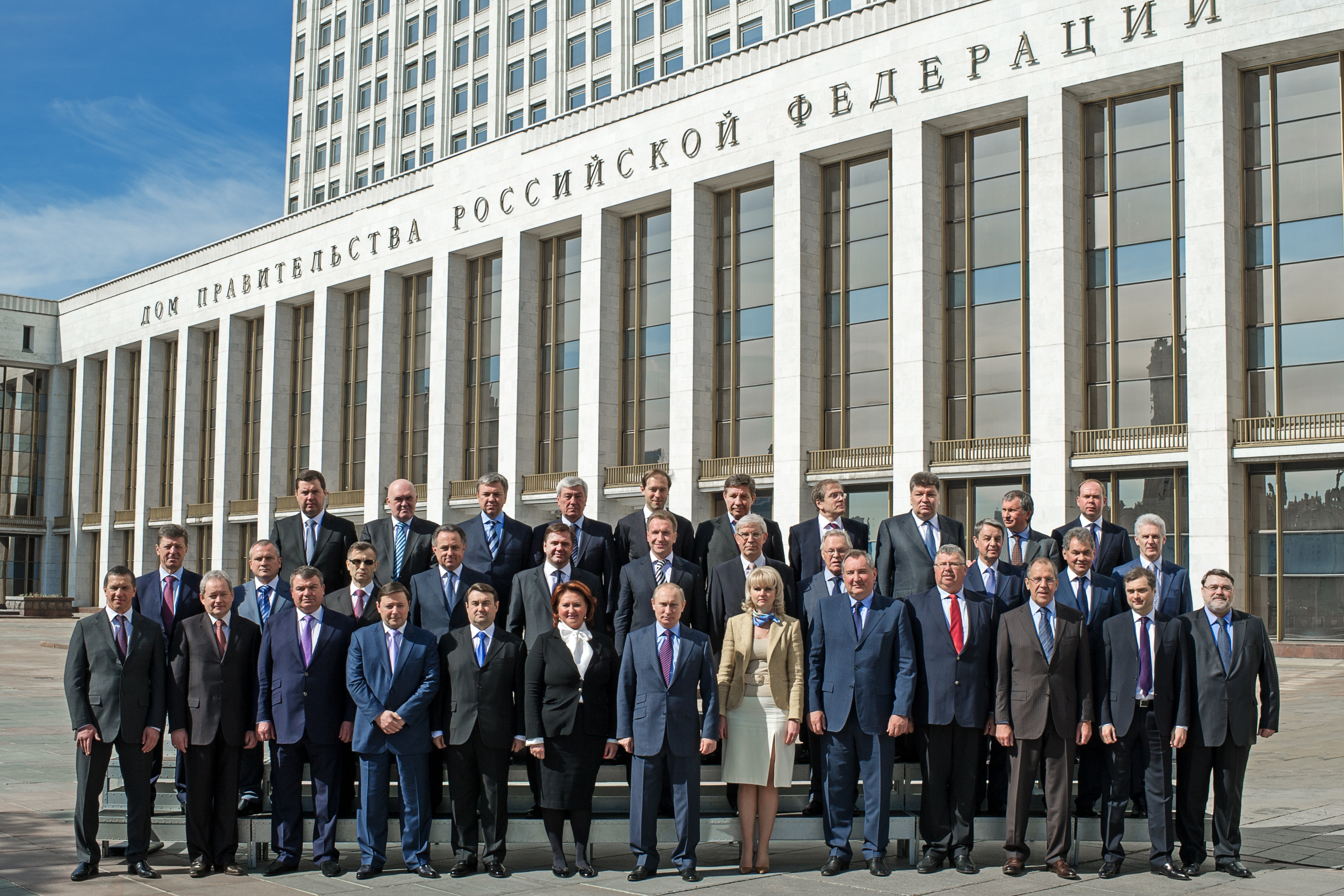
Second Cabinet of Vladimir Putin

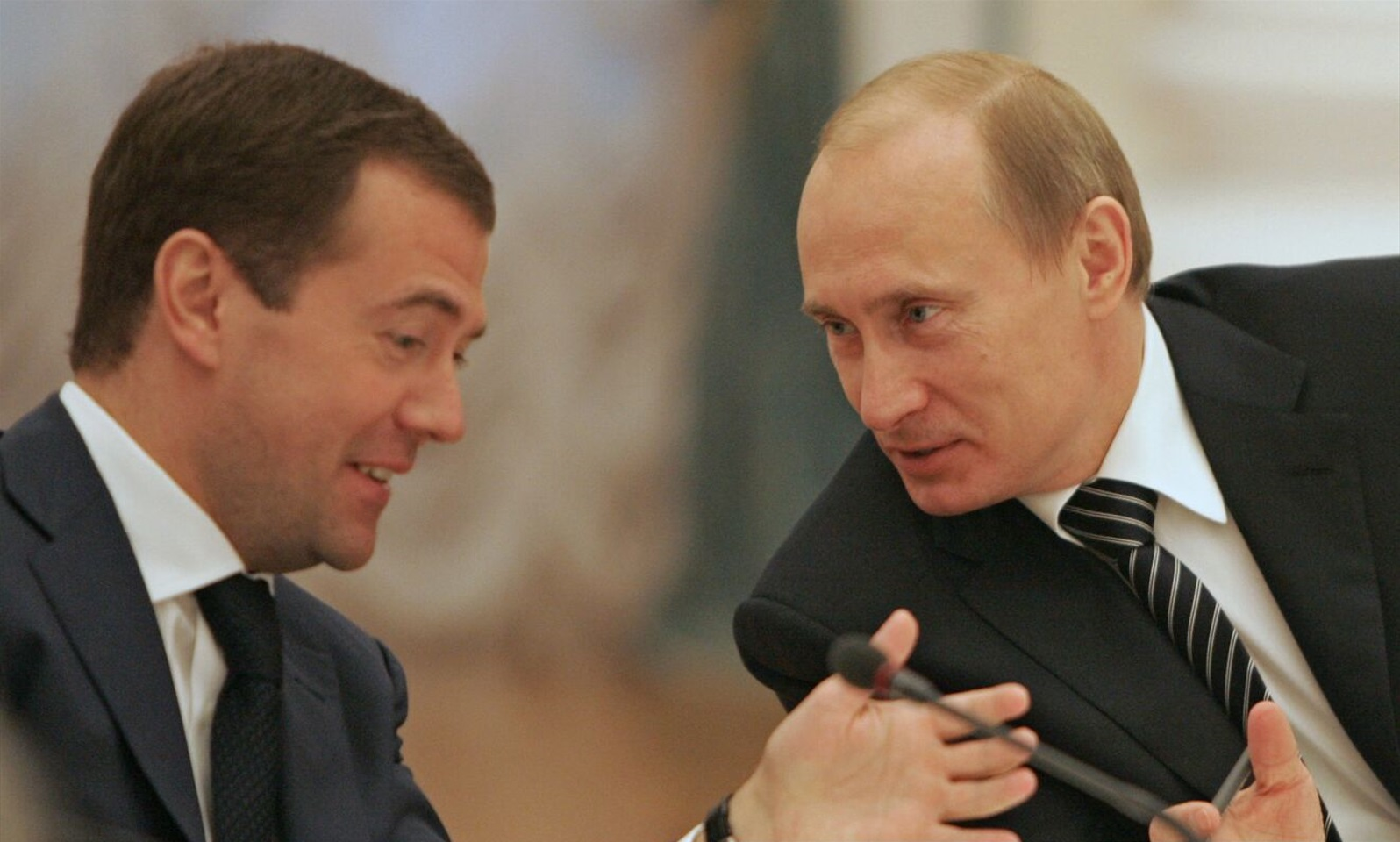
Vladimir Putin with Dmitry Medvedev

Putin was barred from a third term by the Constitution. First Deputy Prime Minister Dmitry Medvedev was elected his successor. On 8 May 2008, only a day after handing the presidency to Medvedev, Putin was appointed Prime Minister of Russia, maintaining his political dominance.

The Great Recession hit the Russian economy especially hard, interrupting the flow of cheap Western credit and investments. This coincided with tension in relationships with the EU and the U.S. following the 2008 South Ossetia war, in which Russia defeated a small force in Georgia due to its hopes to join NATO.

However, the large financial reserves, accumulated in the Stabilization Fund of Russia in the previous period of high oil prices, alongside the strong management helped the country to cope with the crisis and resume economic growth since mid-2009. The Russian government's anti-crisis measures have been praised by the World Bank, which said in its Russia Economic Report from November 2008: "prudent fiscal management and substantial financial reserves have protected Russia from deeper consequences of this external shock. The government's policy response so far—swift, comprehensive, and coordinated—has helped limit the impact." Putin himself named the overcoming of consequences of the world economic crisis one of the two main achievements of his 2nd Premiership (the other named achievement being the stabilisation of the size of Russia's population between 2008 and 2011 following the long period of demographic collapse started in the 1990s).

At the United Russia Congress in Moscow on 24 September 2011, Medvedev officially proposed that Putin stand for the Presidency in 2012; an offer which Putin accepted. Given United Russia's near-total dominance of Russian politics, many observers believed that Putin was all but assured of a third term. The move was expected to see Medvedev stand on the United Russia ticket in the parliamentary elections in December, with a goal of becoming prime minister at the end of his presidential term. During the 2012 presidential campaign, Putin published 7 articles to present his vision for the future.

After the parliamentary elections on 4 December 2011, tens of thousands Russians engaged in protests against alleged electoral fraud, the largest protests in Putin's time; protesters criticized Putin and United Russia and demanded annulment of the election results. However, those protests, organized by the leaders of the Russian non-systemic opposition, sparked the fear of a colour revolution in society, and a number of "anti-Orange" counter-protests (the name alludes to the Orange Revolution in Ukraine) and rallies of Putin supporters were carried out, surpassing in scale the opposition protests.

== Third Presidential term (2012–2018) ==
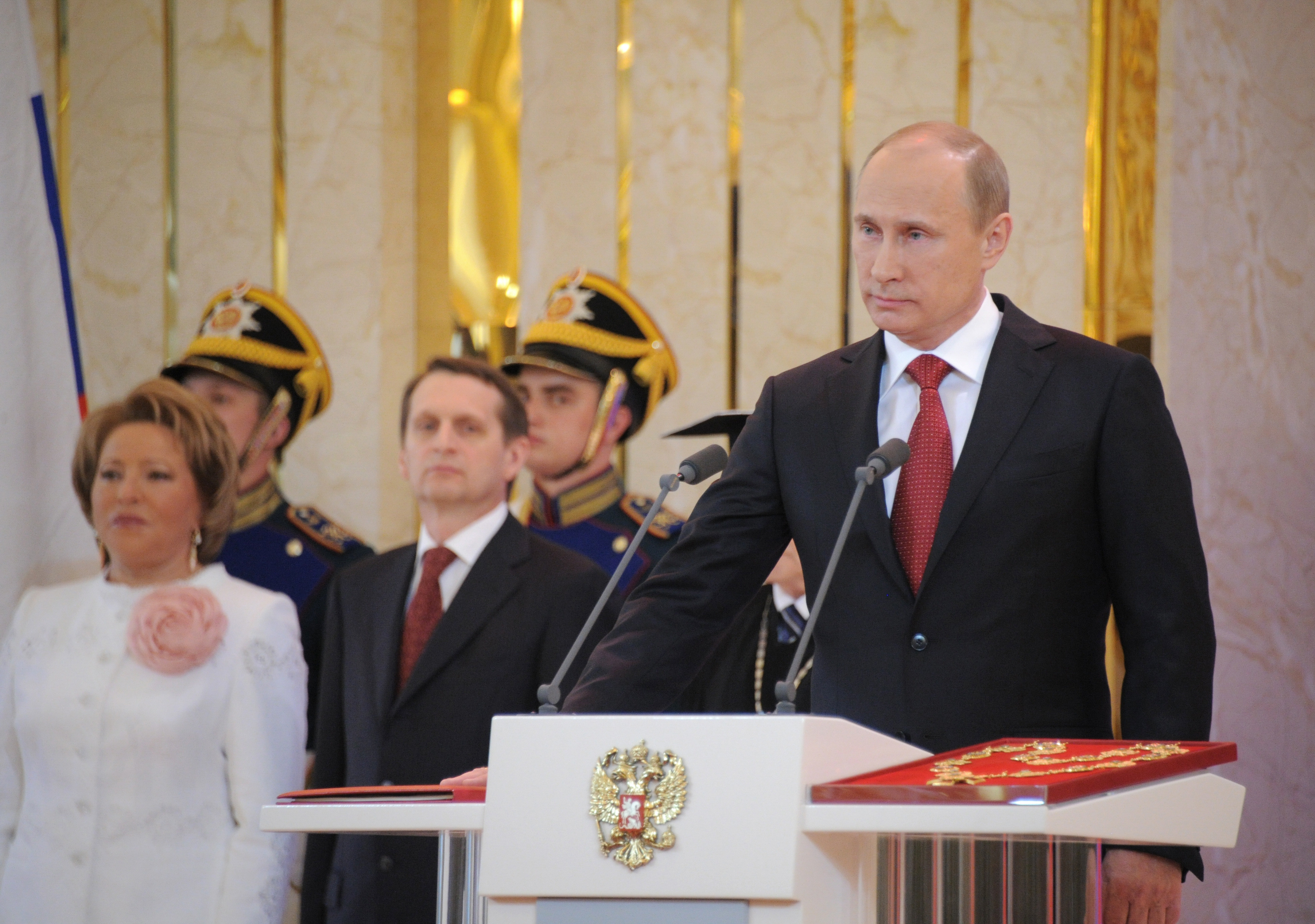
Putin taking the presidential oath at his 3rd inauguration ceremony (7 May 2012)

On 4 March 2012, Putin won the 2012 Russian presidential elections in the first round, with 63.6% of the vote. While extraordinary measures were taken to make the elections transparent, including the usage of webcams on the vast majority of polling stations, the vote was criticized by Russian opposition and some international bodies for perceived irregularities.. Several heads of states around the world congratulated Putin on winning elections. Chinese Communist Party general secretary Hu Jintao congratulated Vladimir Putin on taking office as Russian president, and wished the Russian people greater achievements in developing their country under Putin's leadership. The Prime Minister of India, Manmohan Singh said "Your success in these elections is an affirmation by the Russian people of your vision of a strong, prosperous and democratic Russia," and added that he "deeply appreciated the personal commitment and attention that you have brought to nurturing the India-Russia strategic partnership over the last 12 years". The President of Pakistan, Asif Ali Zardari called the election results a "resounding victory". Venezuela President Hugo Chavez personally congratulated Putin on his victory, calling Putin "a driving force behind strategic ties of cooperation between Venezuela and Russia."

Anti-Putin protests took place during and directly after the presidential campaign. The most notorious protest was the 21 February Pussy Riot performance, and subsequent trial. Also, an estimated 8,000-20,000 protesters gathered in Moscow on 6 May, when eighty people were injured in confrontations with police, and 450 were arrested, with another 120 arrests taking place the following day.

Putin was inaugurated in the Kremlin on 7 May 2012. On his first day as president, Putin issued 14 Presidential decrees, including a lengthy one stating wide-ranging goals for the Russian economy. Other decrees concerned education, housing, skilled-labor training, relations with the European Union, the defense industry, inter-ethnic relations, and other policy areas dealt with in Putin's programme articles issued during the Presidential campaign.

In 2012 and 2013, Putin and the United Russia backed stricter legislation against the rights of the LGBT community in Russia, first in Saint Petersburg, Arkhangelsk and Novosibirsk, and a law against "homosexual propaganda" (which prohibits such symbols as the rainbow flag as well as published works containing homosexual content) was adopted by State Duma in June 2013. Responding to international concerns about Russia's legislation, Putin asked critics to note that the law was a "ban on the propaganda of pedophilia and homosexuality" and he stated that homosexual visitors to the 2014 Winter Olympics should "leave the children in peace" but denied there was any "professional, career or social discrimination" against homosexuals in Russia.

In June 2013, Putin attended a televised rally of the All-Russia People's Front where he was elected head of the movement, which was set up in 2011. According to journalist Steve Rosenberg, the movement is intended to "reconnect the Kremlin to the Russian people" and one day, if necessary, replace the increasingly unpopular United Russia party that currently backs Putin.

=== Annexation of Crimea ===
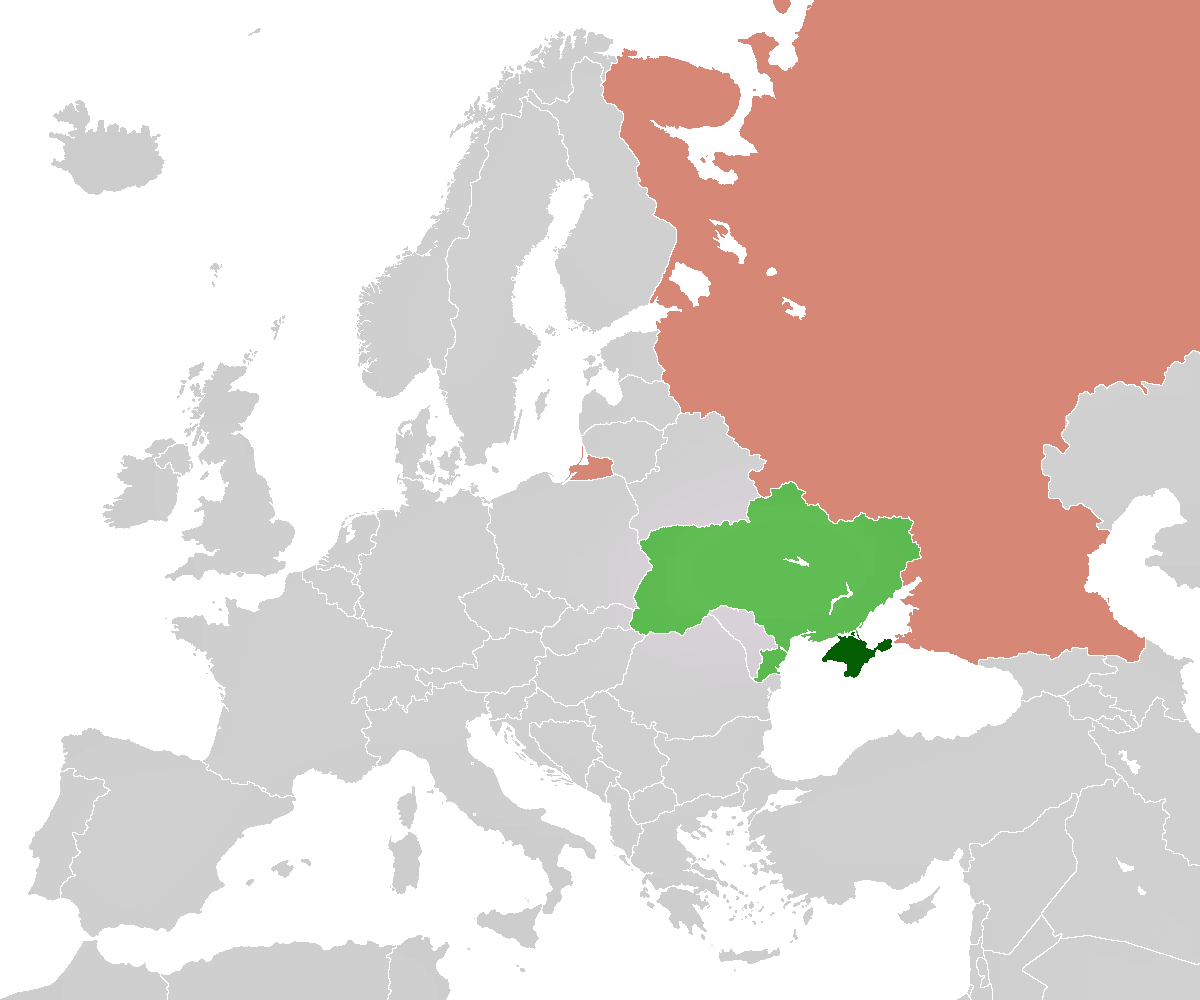
Crimea (dark green), rest of Ukraine (light green) and Russia (light red) in Europe

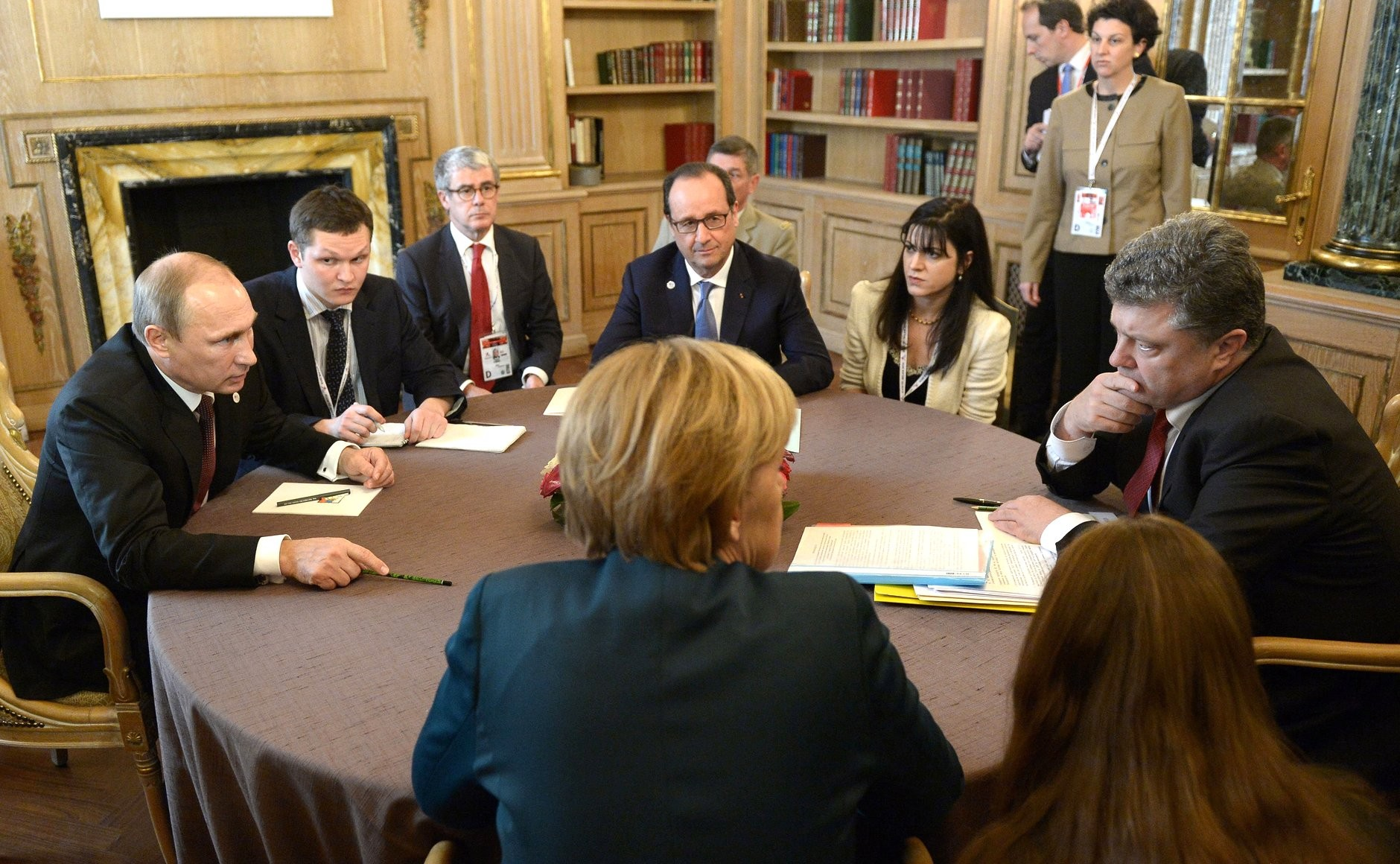
Putin in Normandy Format talks with Ukrainian president Petro Poroshenko, German chancellor Angela Merkel and French president François Hollande, 17 October 2014.

In February 2014, Russia made several military incursions into Ukrainian territory. After the Euromaidan protests and the fall of Ukrainian president Viktor Yanukovych, Russian soldiers without insignias took control of strategic positions and infrastructure within the Ukrainian territory of Crimea. Russia then annexed Crimea and Sevastopol after a referendum in which, according to official results, Crimeans voted to join the Russian Federation. Subsequently, demonstrations against Ukrainian Rada legislative actions by pro-Russian groups in the Donbas area of Ukraine escalated into the Russo-Ukrainian War between the Ukrainian government and the Russia-backed separatist forces of the self-declared Donetsk and Luhansk People's Republics. In August 2014, Russian military vehicles crossed the border in several locations of Donetsk Oblast. The incursion by the Russian military was seen by Ukrainian authorities as responsible for the defeat of Ukrainian forces in early September.

In October 2014, Putin addressed Russian security concerns in Sochi at the Valdai International Discussion Club. In November 2014, the Ukrainian military reported intensive movement of troops and equipment from Russia into the separatist-controlled parts of eastern Ukraine. The Associated Press reported 80 unmarked military vehicles on the move in rebel-controlled areas. An OSCE Special Monitoring Mission observed convoys of heavy weapons and tanks in DPR-controlled territory without insignia. OSCE monitors further stated that they observed vehicles transporting ammunition and soldiers' dead bodies crossing the Russian-Ukrainian border under the guise of humanitarian-aid convoys.

As of early August 2015, the OSCE observed over 21 such vehicles marked with the Russian military code for soldiers killed in action. According to The Moscow Times, Russia has tried to intimidate and silence human-rights workers discussing Russian soldiers' deaths in the conflict. The OSCE repeatedly reported that its observers were denied access to the areas controlled by "combined Russian-separatist forces".

In October 2015, The Washington Post reported that Russia had redeployed some of its elite units from Ukraine to Syria in recent weeks to support Syrian president Bashar al-Assad. In December 2015, Putin admitted that Russian military intelligence officers were operating in Ukraine.

The Moscow Times quoted pro-Russian academic Andrei Tsygankov as saying that many members of the international community assumed that Putin's annexation of Crimea had initiated a completely new type of Russian foreign policy and that his foreign policy had shifted "from state-driven foreign policy" to taking an offensive stance to recreate the Soviet Union. In July 2015, he opined that this policy shift could be understood as Putin trying to defend nations in Russia's sphere of influence from "encroaching western power".

=== Intervention in Syria ===
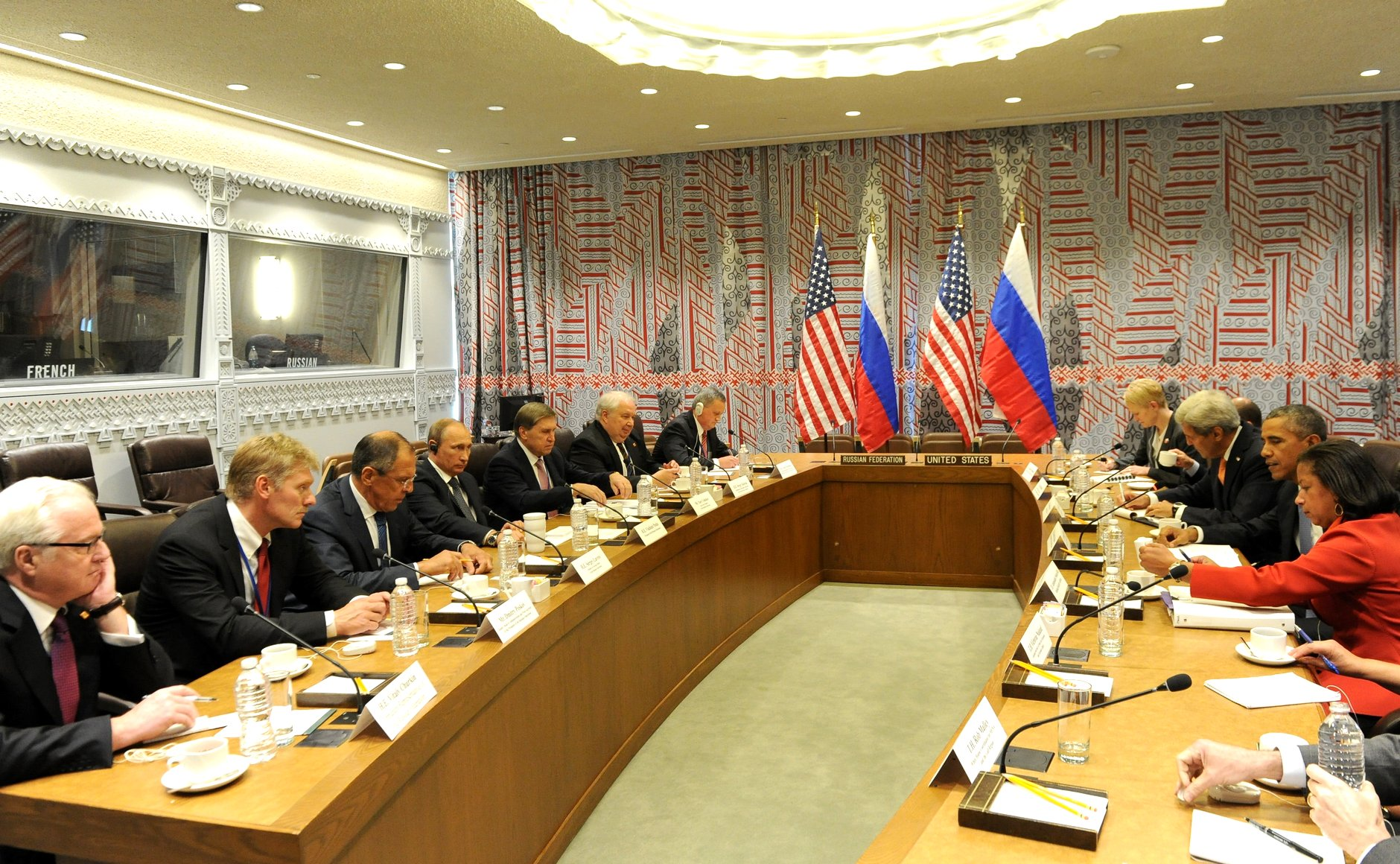
Putin meets with U.S. president Barack Obama in New York City to discuss Syria and ISIL, 29 September 2015.

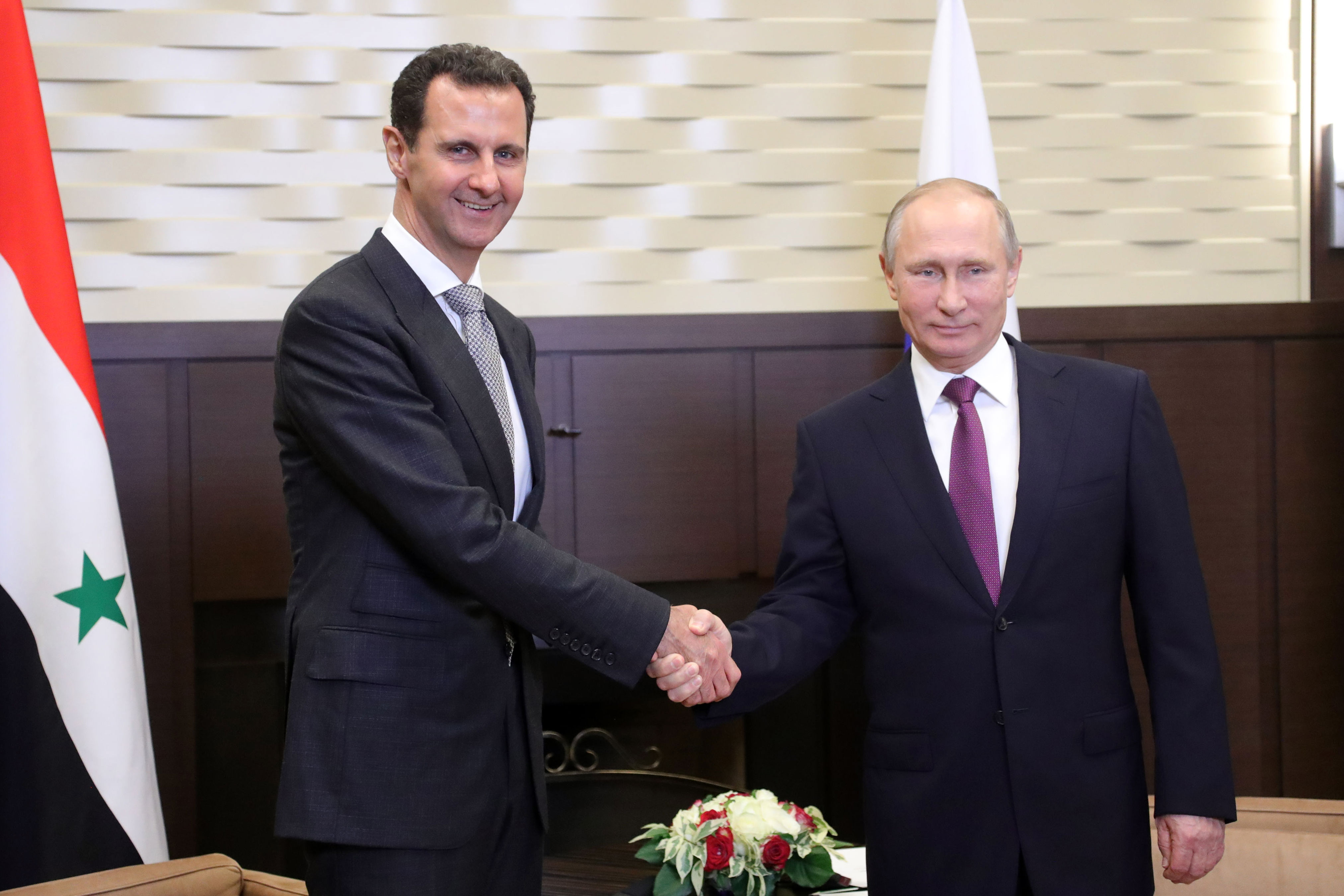
Putin with Syrian president Bashar al-Assad in 2017

On 30 September 2015, President Putin authorized Russian military intervention in the Syrian civil war, following a formal request by the Syrian government for military help against rebel and jihadist groups.

The Russian military activities consisted of air strikes, cruise missile strikes and the use of front line advisors and Russian special forces against militant groups opposed to the Syrian government, including the Syrian opposition, as well as Islamic State of Iraq and the Levant (ISIL), al-Nusra Front (al-Qaeda in the Levant), Hay'at Tahrir al-Sham, Ahrar al-Sham, and the Army of Conquest. After Putin's announcement on 14 March 2016 that the mission he had set for the Russian military in Syria had been "largely accomplished" and ordered the withdrawal of the "main part" of the Russian forces from Syria, Russian forces deployed in Syria continued to actively operate in support of the Syrian government.

=== Russia's interference in the 2016 US election ===
In January 2017, a U.S. intelligence community assessment expressed high confidence that Putin personally ordered an influence campaign, initially to denigrate Hillary Clinton and to harm her electoral chances and potential presidency, then later developing "a clear preference" for Donald Trump. Trump consistently denied any Russian interference in the U.S. election, as did Putin in December 2016, March 2017, June 2017, and July 2017.

Putin later stated that interference was "theoretically possible" and could have been perpetrated by "patriotically minded" Russian hackers, and on another occasion claimed "not even Russians, but Ukrainians, Tatars or Jews, but with Russian citizenship" might have been responsible. In July 2018, The New York Times reported that the CIA had long nurtured a Russian source who eventually rose to a position close to Putin, allowing the source to pass key information in 2016 about Putin's direct involvement. Putin continued similar attempts in the 2020 U.S. presidential election.

== 2018–2024: Fourth presidential term ==
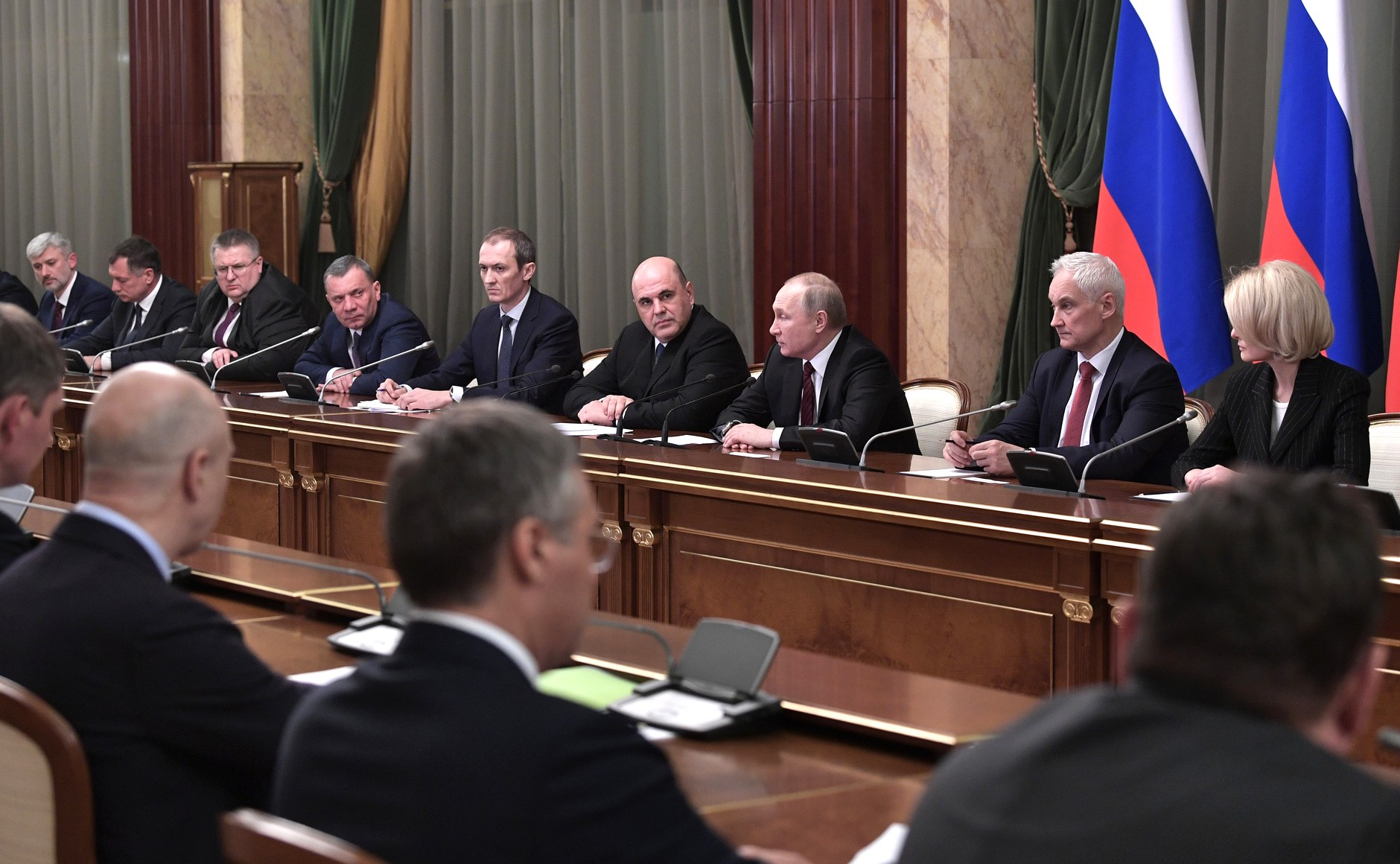
Putin and the newly appointed prime minister Mikhail Mishustin meeting with members of Mishustin's Cabinet, 21 January 2020

Putin won the 2018 Russian presidential election with more than 76% of the vote. His fourth term began on 7 May 2018. On the same day, Putin invited Dmitry Medvedev to form a new government. On 15 May 2018, Putin took part in the opening of the movement along the highway section of the Crimean bridge. On 18 May 2018, Putin signed decrees on the composition of the new Government. On 25 May 2018, Putin announced that he would not run for president in 2024, justifying this in compliance with the Russian Constitution. On 14 June 2018, Putin opened the 21st FIFA World Cup, which took place in Russia for the first time. On 18 October 2018, Putin said Russians will 'go to Heaven as martyrs' in the event of a nuclear war as he would only use nuclear weapons in retaliation. In September 2019, Putin's administration interfered with the results of Russia's nationwide regional elections and manipulated it by eliminating all candidates in the opposition. The event that was aimed at contributing to the ruling party, United Russia's victory, also contributed to inciting mass protests for democracy, leading to large-scale arrests and cases of police brutality.

On 15 January 2020, Medvedev and his entire government resigned after Putin's 2020 Presidential Address to the Federal Assembly. Putin suggested major constitutional amendments that could extend his political power after presidency. At the same time, on behalf of Putin, he continued to exercise his powers until the formation of a new government. Putin suggested that Medvedev take the newly created post of deputy chairman of the Security Council.

On the same day, Putin nominated Mikhail Mishustin, head of the country's Federal Tax Service for the post of prime minister. The next day, he was confirmed by the State Duma to the post, and appointed prime minister by Putin's decree. This was the first time ever that a prime minister was confirmed without any votes against. On 21 January 2020, Mishustin presented to Putin a draft structure of his Cabinet. On the same day, the president signed a decree on the structure of the Cabinet and appointed the proposed ministers.

=== COVID-19 pandemic ===
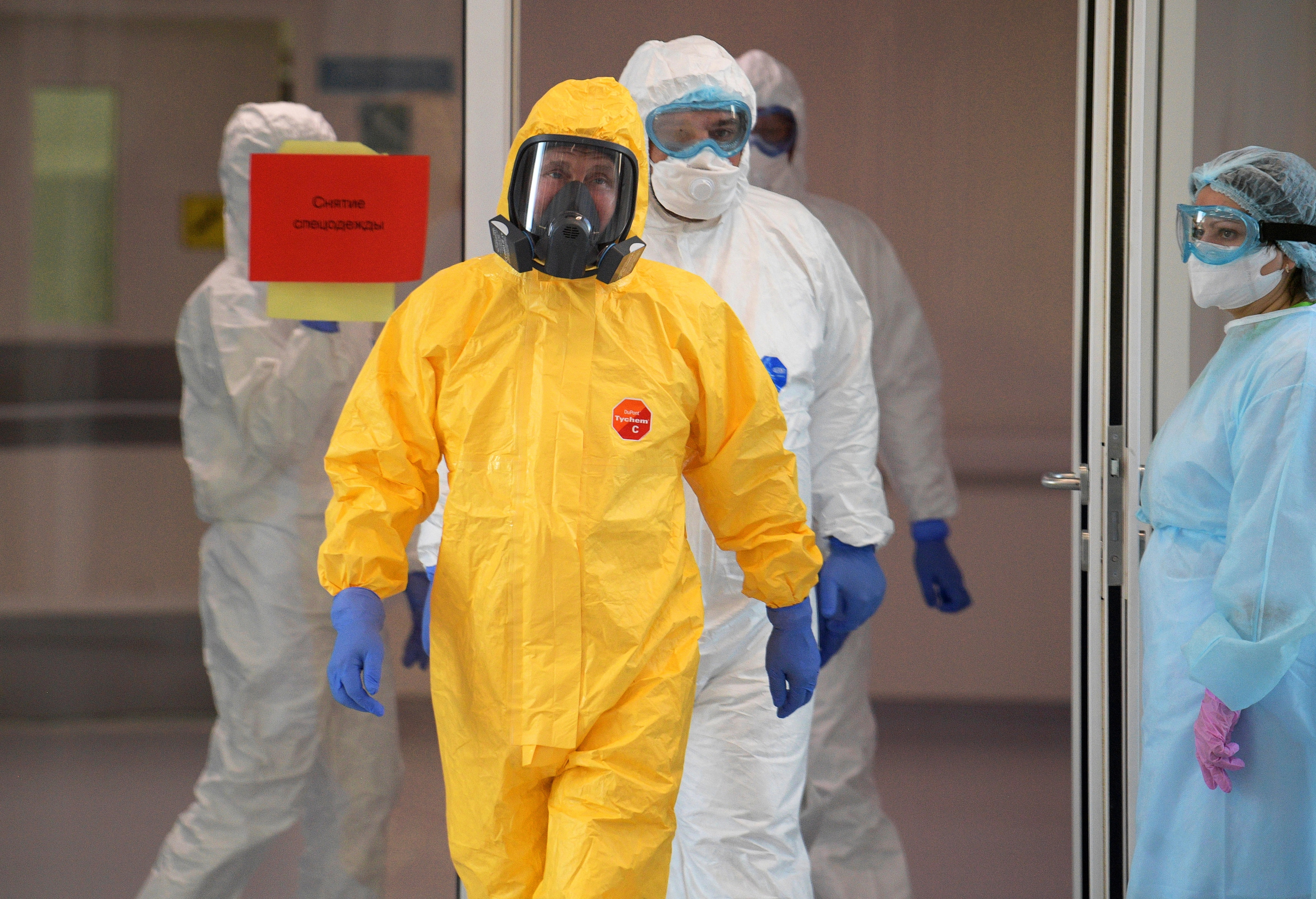
Putin (dressed in the yellow hazmat suit) visits COVID-19 patients at the City Clinical Hospital No. 40 in Moscow, 24 March 2020.

On 15 March 2020, Putin instructed to form a Working Group of the State Council to counteract the spread of COVID-19. Putin appointed Moscow Mayor Sergey Sobyanin as the head of the group.

On 22 March 2020, after a phone call with Italian prime minister Giuseppe Conte, Putin arranged the Russian army to send military medics, special disinfection vehicles and other medical equipment to Italy, which was the European country hardest hit by the COVID-19 pandemic. Putin began working remotely from his office at Novo-Ogaryovo. According to Dmitry Peskov, Putin passed daily tests for COVID-19, and his health was not in danger.

On 25 March, President Putin announced in a televised address to the nation that the 22 April constitutional referendum would be postponed due to COVID-19. He added that the next week would be a nationwide paid holiday and urged Russians to stay at home. Putin also announced a list of measures of social protection, support for small and medium-sized enterprises, and changes in fiscal policy. Putin announced the following measures for microenterprises, small- and medium-sized businesses: deferring tax payments (except Russia's value-added tax) for the next six months, cutting the size of social security contributions in half, deferring social security contributions, deferring loan repayments for the next six months, a six-month moratorium on fines, debt collection, and creditors' applications for bankruptcy of debtor enterprises.

On 2 April 2020, Putin again issued an address in which he announced prolongation of the non-working time until 30 April. Putin likened Russia's fight against COVID-19 to Russia's battles with invading Pecheneg and Cuman steppe nomads in the 10th and 11th centuries. In a 24 to 27 April Levada poll, 48% of Russian respondents said that they disapproved of Putin's handling of the COVID-19 pandemic, and his strict isolation and lack of leadership during the crisis was widely commented as sign of losing his "strongman" image.

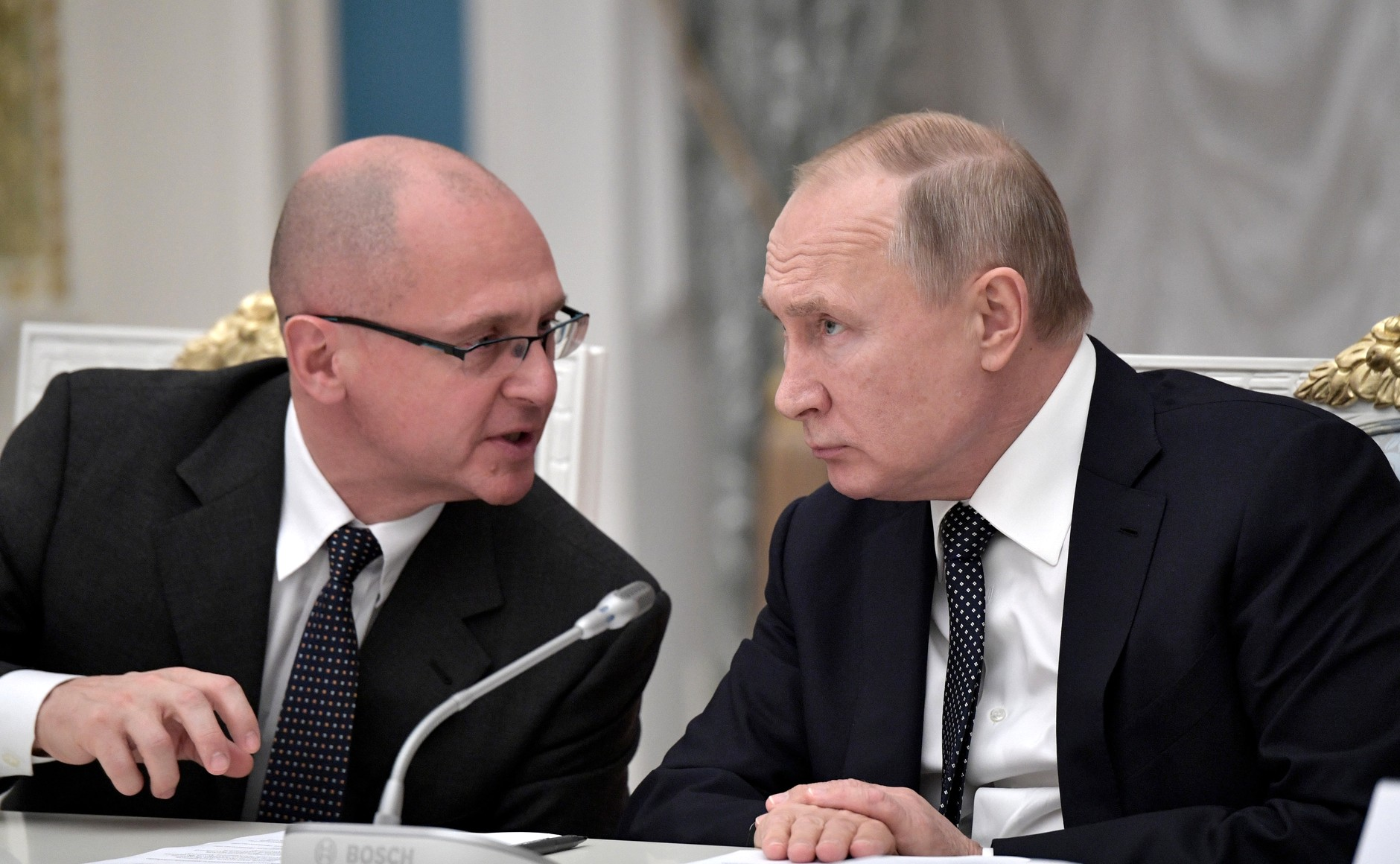
Putin's first deputy chief of staff Sergey Kiriyenko (left) is in charge of Russia's domestic politics.

In June 2021, Putin said he was fully vaccinated against the disease with the Sputnik V vaccine, emphasising that while vaccinations should be voluntary, making them mandatory in some professions would slow down the spread of COVID-19. In September, Putin entered self-isolation after people in his inner circle tested positive for the disease. According to a report by the Wall Street Journal, Putin's inner circle of advisors shrank during the COVID-19 lockdown to a small number of hawkish advisers.

=== Constitutional referendum and amendments ===
Putin signed an executive order on 3 July 2020 to officially insert amendments into the Russian Constitution, allowing him to run for two additional six-year terms. These amendments took effect on 4 July 2020.

In 2020 and 2021, protests were held in the Khabarovsk Krai in Russia's Far East in support of arrested regional governor Sergei Furgal. The 2020 Khabarovsk Krai protests became increasingly anti-Putin over time. A July 2020 Levada poll found that 45% of surveyed Russians supported the protests. On 22 December 2020, Putin signed a bill giving lifetime prosecutorial immunity to Russian ex-presidents.

=== 2021–2022 Russo-Ukrainian crisis ===
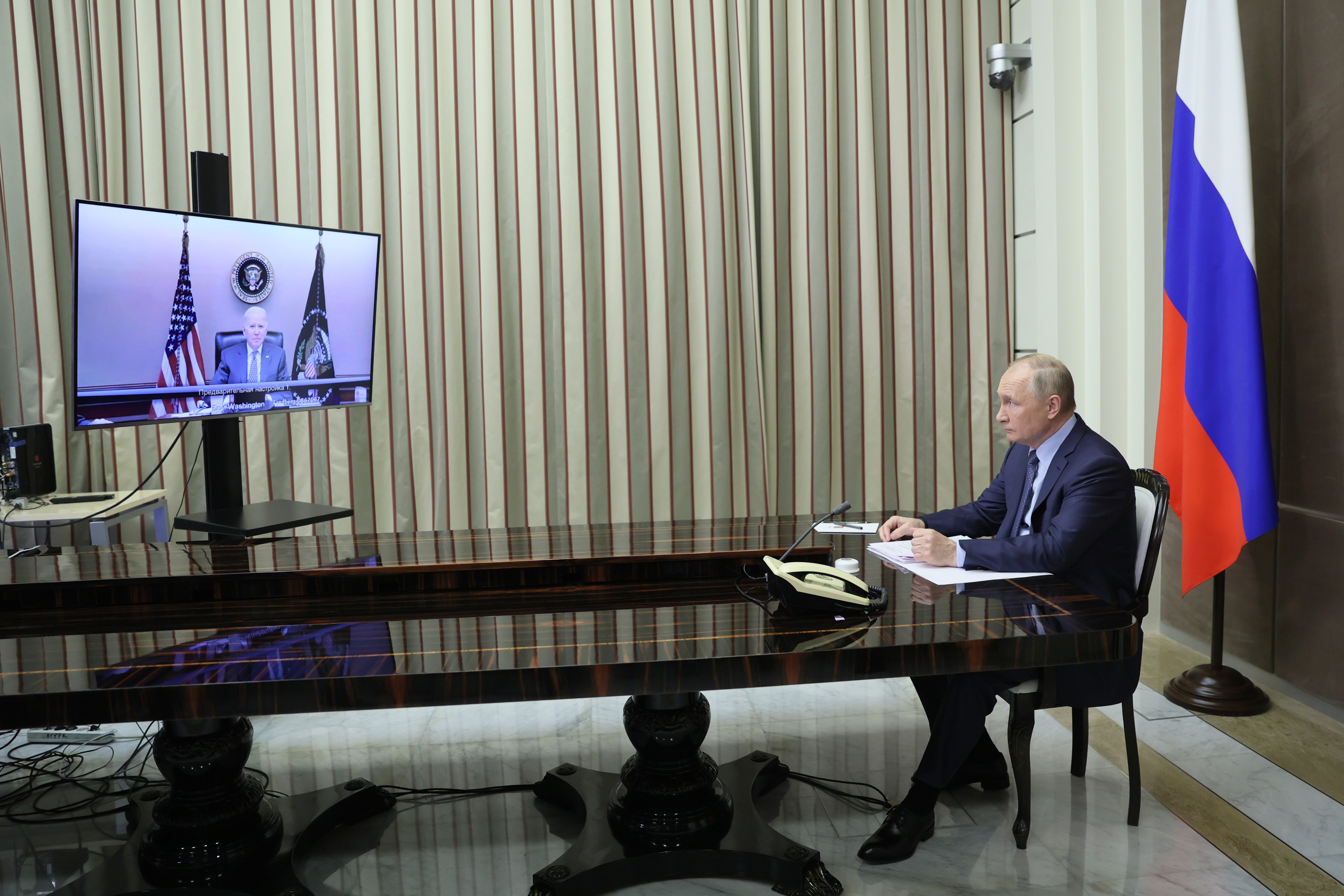
Putin holds a video call with U.S. president Joe Biden on 7 December 2021.

In July 2021, Putin published an essay titled On the Historical Unity of Russians and Ukrainians, in which he states that Belarusians, Ukrainians and Russians should be in one All-Russian nation as a part of the Russian world and are "one people" whom "forces that have always sought to undermine our unity" wanted to "divide and rule". The essay denies the existence of Ukraine as an independent nation.

On 30 November 2021, Putin stated that an enlargement of NATO in Ukraine would be a "red line" issue for Russia. The Kremlin repeatedly denied that it had any plans to invade Ukraine, and Putin himself dismissed such fears as "alarmist". On 21 February 2022, Putin signed a decree recognizing the two self-proclaimed separatist republics in Donbas as independent states and made an address concerning the events in Ukraine.

Putin was persuaded to invade Ukraine by a small group of his closest associates, especially Nikolai Patrushev, Yury Kovalchuk and Alexander Bortnikov. According to sources close to the Kremlin, most of Putin's advisers and associates opposed the invasion, but Putin overruled them. The invasion of Ukraine had been planned for almost a year.

=== Full-scale invasion of Ukraine (2022–present) ===
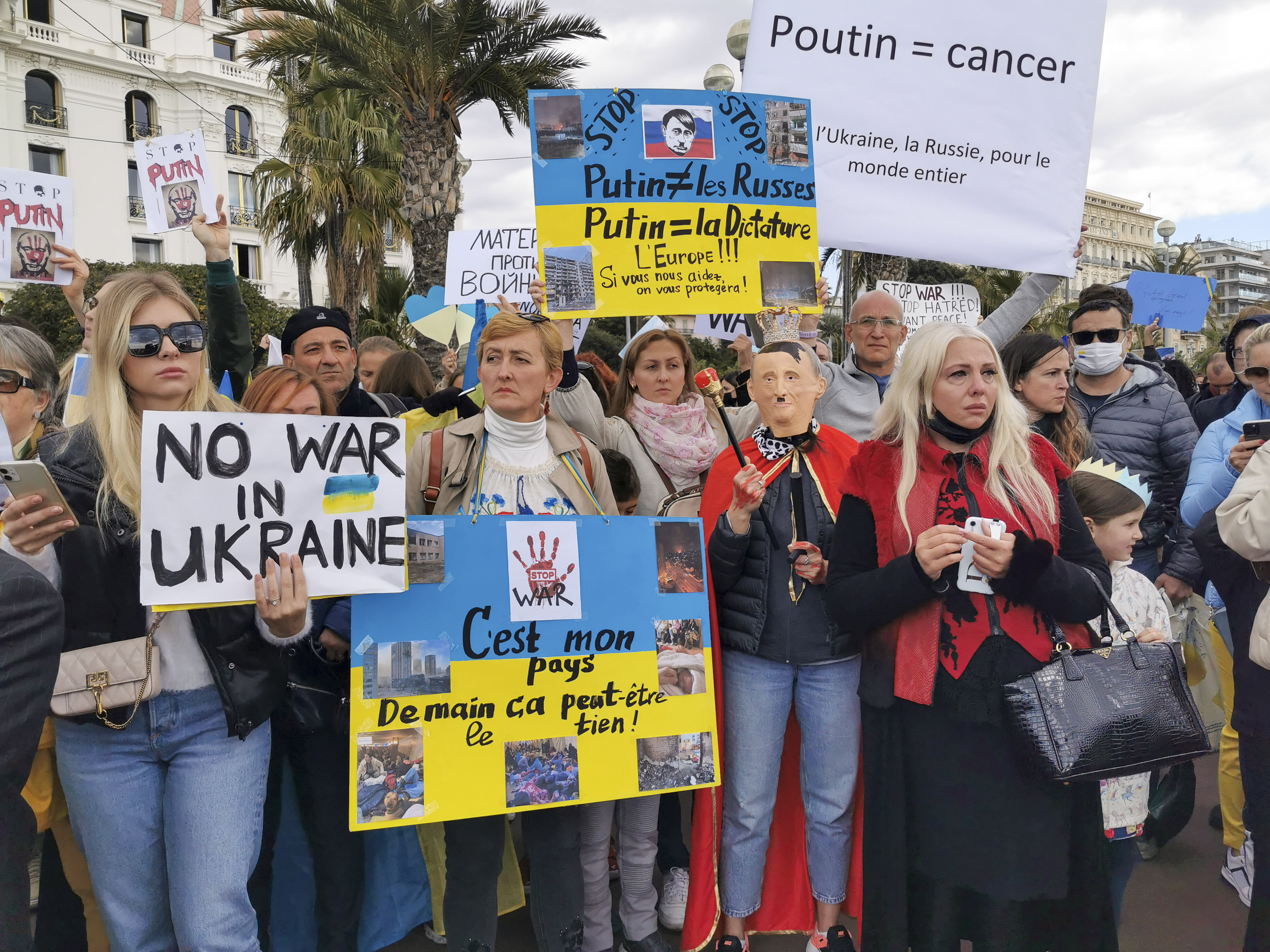
Protest against the Russian invasion of Ukraine in Nice, France, 27 February 2022

On 24 February, Putin in a televised address announced a "special military operation" (SMO) in Ukraine, launching an invasion. Citing "denazification", he claimed to be invading to protect people in the Russian-speaking Donbas region who, according to Putin, faced "humiliation and genocide". He launched a war to gain control of the rest of Ukraine and overthrow the elected government under the pretext it was run by Nazis. Russia's invasion was met with international condemnation. International sanctions were imposed against Russia, including against Putin. The invasion led to calls for Putin to be charged with war crimes. The International Criminal Court (ICC) stated that it would investigate possible war crimes in Ukraine since 2013, and the US pledged to help the ICC to prosecute Putin for war crimes. In response, Putin put the Strategic Rocket Forces's nuclear deterrence units on high alert. By March, U.S. intelligence agencies determined that Putin was frustrated by slow progress due to unexpectedly strong Ukrainian defense.

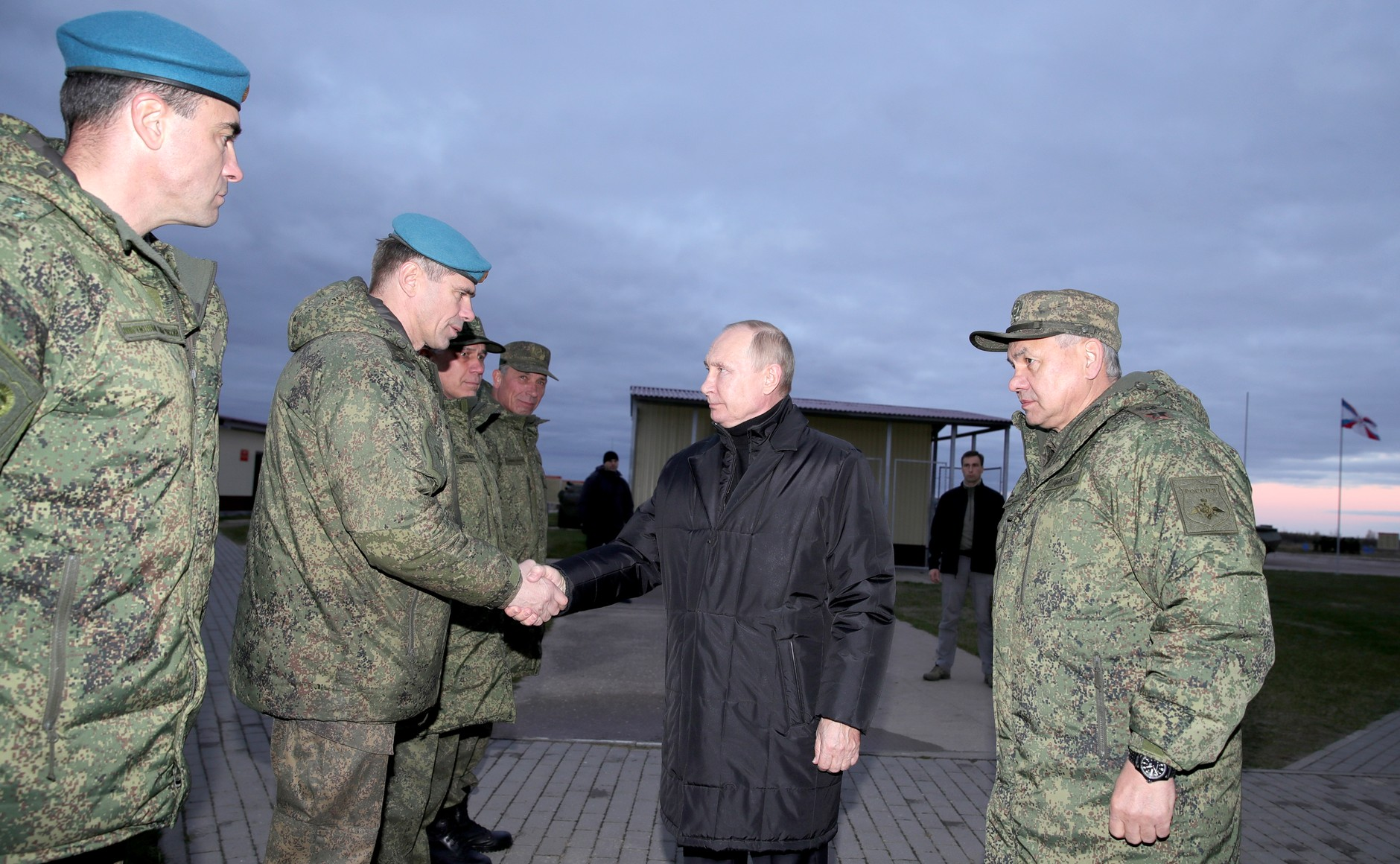
Putin and Defense Minister Sergei Shoigu with Russian officers on 20 October 2022

On 4 March, Putin signed a law introducing prison sentences of up to 15 years for publishing "knowingly false information" about the Russian military and its operations, leading to some media outlets in Russia stopping reporting on Ukraine. On 7 March, as a condition for ending the invasion, the Kremlin demanded Ukraine's neutrality, recognition of Crimea as Russian territory, and the self-proclaimed republics of Donetsk and Luhansk as independent states. Putin promised that no conscripts would be used in the SMO. On 16 March, Putin issued a warning to Russian "traitors" who he said the West wanted to use as a "fifth column" to destroy Russia. Following the invasion of Ukraine in 2022, Russia's long-term demographic crisis deepened due to emigration, lower fertility rates and war casualties.

As early as 25 March, the UN Office of the High Commissioner on Human Rights reported that Putin ordered a "kidnapping" policy, whereby Ukrainian nationals who did not cooperate with the Russian takeover of their homeland were victimized by FSB agents. Ukrainian president Volodymyr Zelenskyy said he was sure Putin thought the Ukrainians would welcome the invading force with "flowers and smiles" while he negotiated that Ukraine would become a non-aligned state.

In September, Putin announced a partial mobilization, following a successful Ukrainian counteroffensive in Kharkiv as well as annexation referendums in Russian-occupied Ukraine.

Ukrainian oblasts annexed by Russia since 2014 (Crimea) and 2022 (Donetsk, Kherson, Luhansk, and Zaporizhzhia), with a red line marking the area of actual control by Russia on 30 September 2022

On 30 September, Putin signed decrees which annexed Donetsk, Luhansk, Zaporizhzhia, and Kherson Oblasts of Ukraine into Russia. The annexations are not recognized by the international community and are illegal under international law. On 11 November the same year, Ukraine liberated Kherson.

In December 2022, he said a war against Ukraine could be a "long process". Hundreds of thousands of people have been killed in the Russo-Ukrainian War. In January 2023, Putin cited recognition of Russia's sovereignty over the annexed territories as a condition for peace talks.

In March 2023, Chinese leader Xi Jinping visited Russia and met with Putin. It was the first international meeting of Putin since the ICC issued a warrant for his arrest.

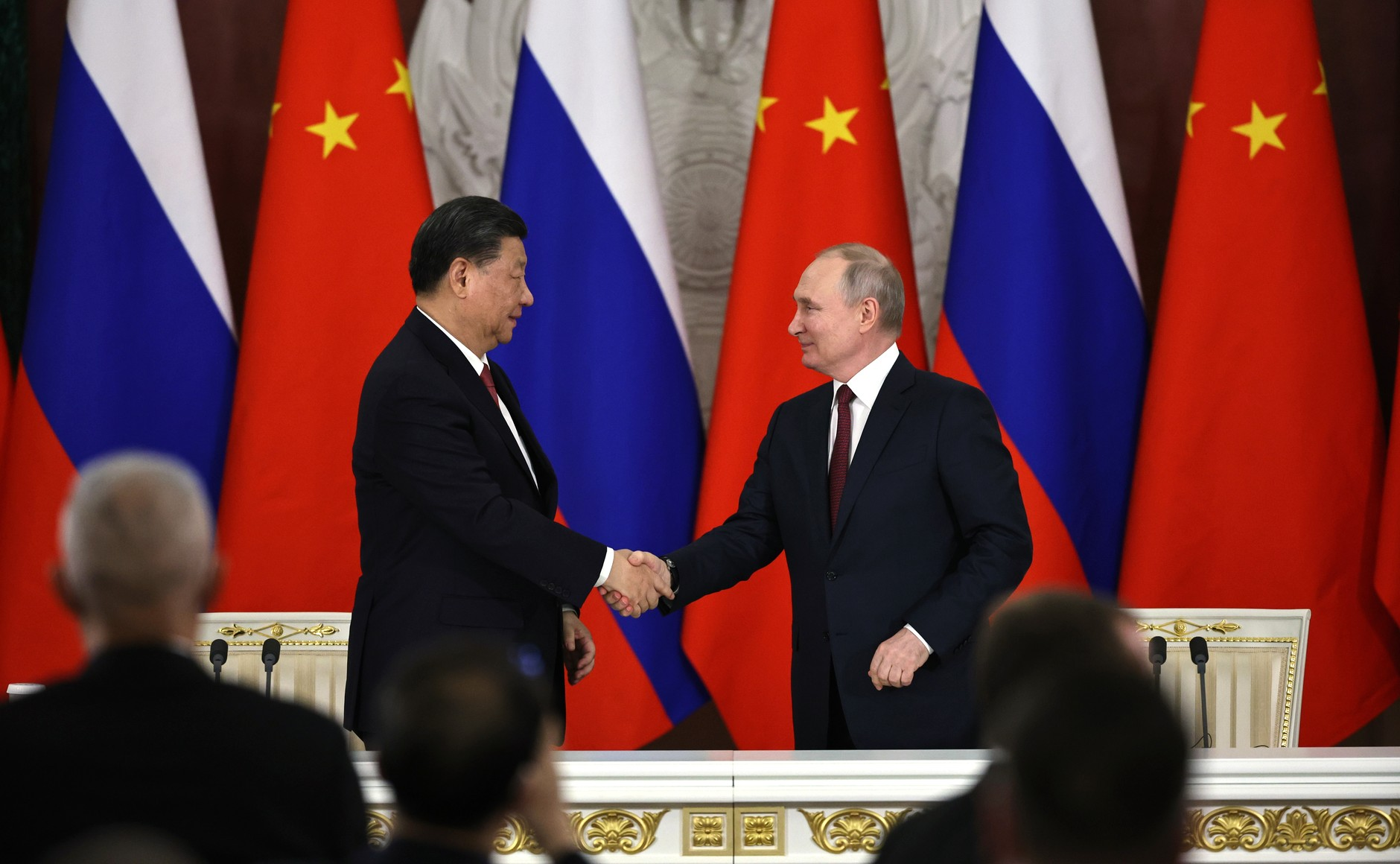
Putin welcomes Chinese leader Xi Jinping to Moscow, 21 March 2023.

In May 2023, South Africa announced it would grant diplomatic immunity to Putin to attend the 15th BRICS Summit. In July 2023, South African president Cyril Ramaphosa announced that Putin would not attend the summit "by mutual agreement" and instead send Foreign Minister Sergei Lavrov.

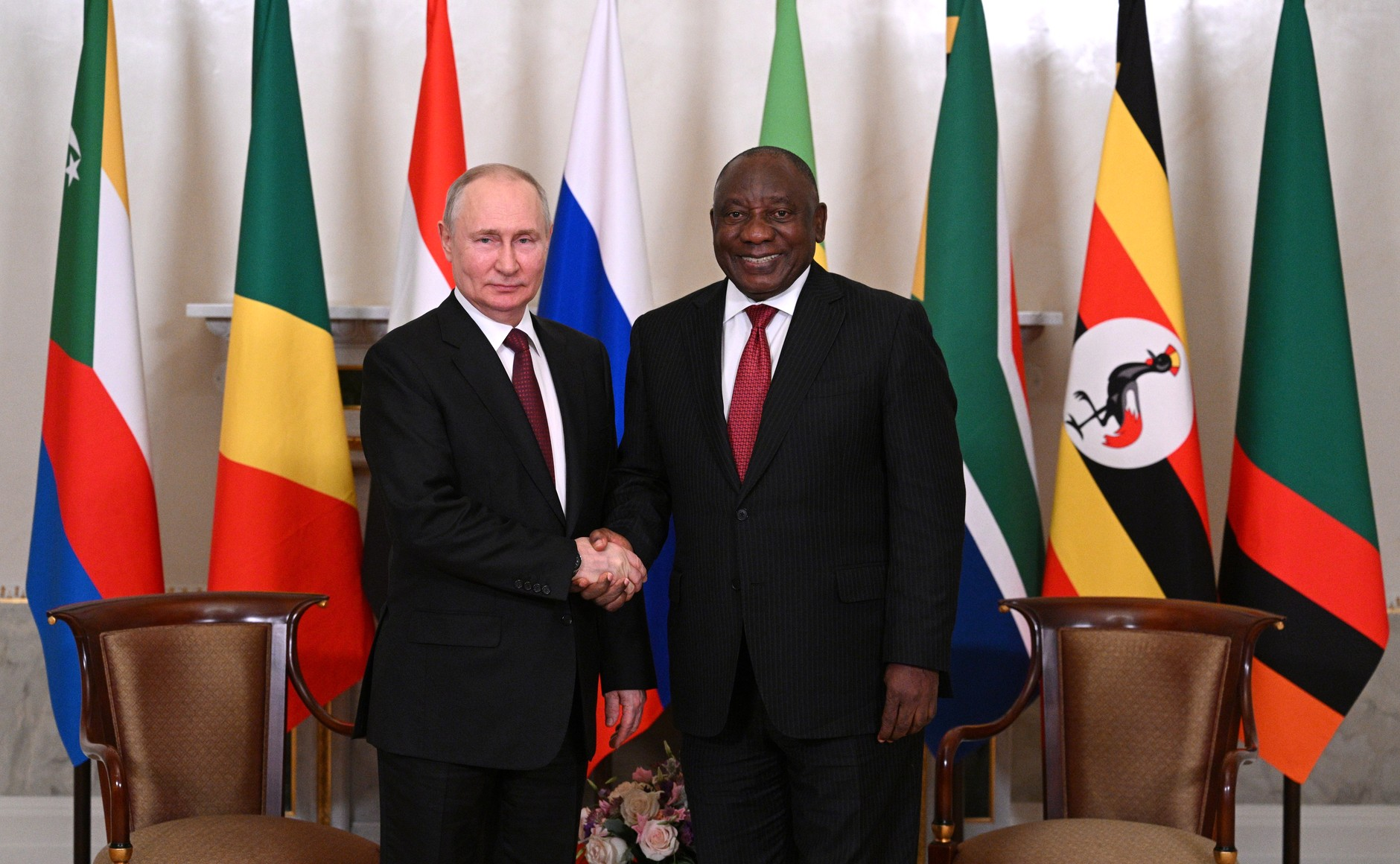
Putin with South African president Cyril Ramaphosa in St. Petersburg on 17 June 2023

In July 2023, Putin threatened to take "reciprocal action" if Ukraine used US-supplied cluster munitions during a Ukrainian counter-offensive. On 17 July, Putin withdrew from a deal that allowed Ukraine to export grain across the Black Sea despite a blockade, risking deepening the global food crisis and antagonizing neutral countries in the Global South.

On 27–28 July, Putin hosted the 2023 Russia–Africa Summit in St. Petersburg, attended by delegations from more than 40 African countries. As of August 2023, the total number of Russian and Ukrainian soldiers killed or wounded during the invasion was nearly 500,000.

Putin condemned the 2023 Hamas-led attack on Israel that sparked the Gaza war and said Israel had a right to defend itself, but criticized Israel's response and said Israel should not besiege the Gaza Strip in the way Nazi Germany besieged Leningrad. Putin suggested Russia could be a mediator. Putin blamed the war on the US' policy in the Middle East and expressed concern over the suffering of Palestinian children. In a December 2023 call, Benjamin Netanyahu expressed displeasure to Putin, over Russia's conduct at the UN and described its growing ties to Iran as dangerous.

In November 2023, Putin claimed Russia was always "ready for talks" to end the "tragedy" of the war in Ukraine, and accused Ukrainian leadership of rejecting peace talks. However, on 14 December 2023, Putin said, "there will only be peace in Ukraine when we achieve our aims", which he said are "de-Nazification, de-militarization and a neutral status" of Ukraine. On 23 December, Putin was reported as signaling through intermediaries since September 2022 that "he is open to a ceasefire that freezes the fighting along the current lines".

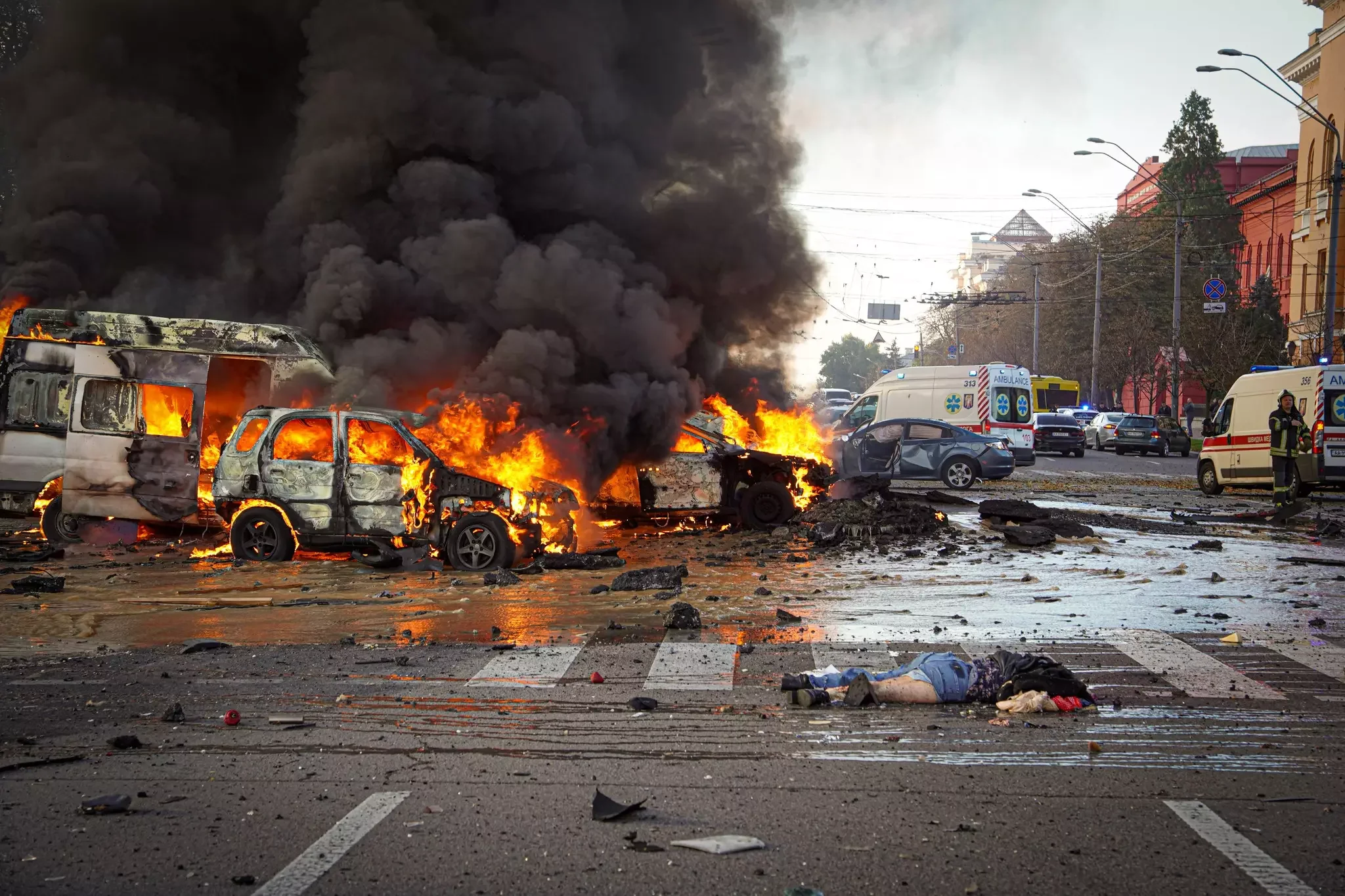
Kyiv after Russian missile strikes on 10 October 2022

=== ICC arrest warrant ===
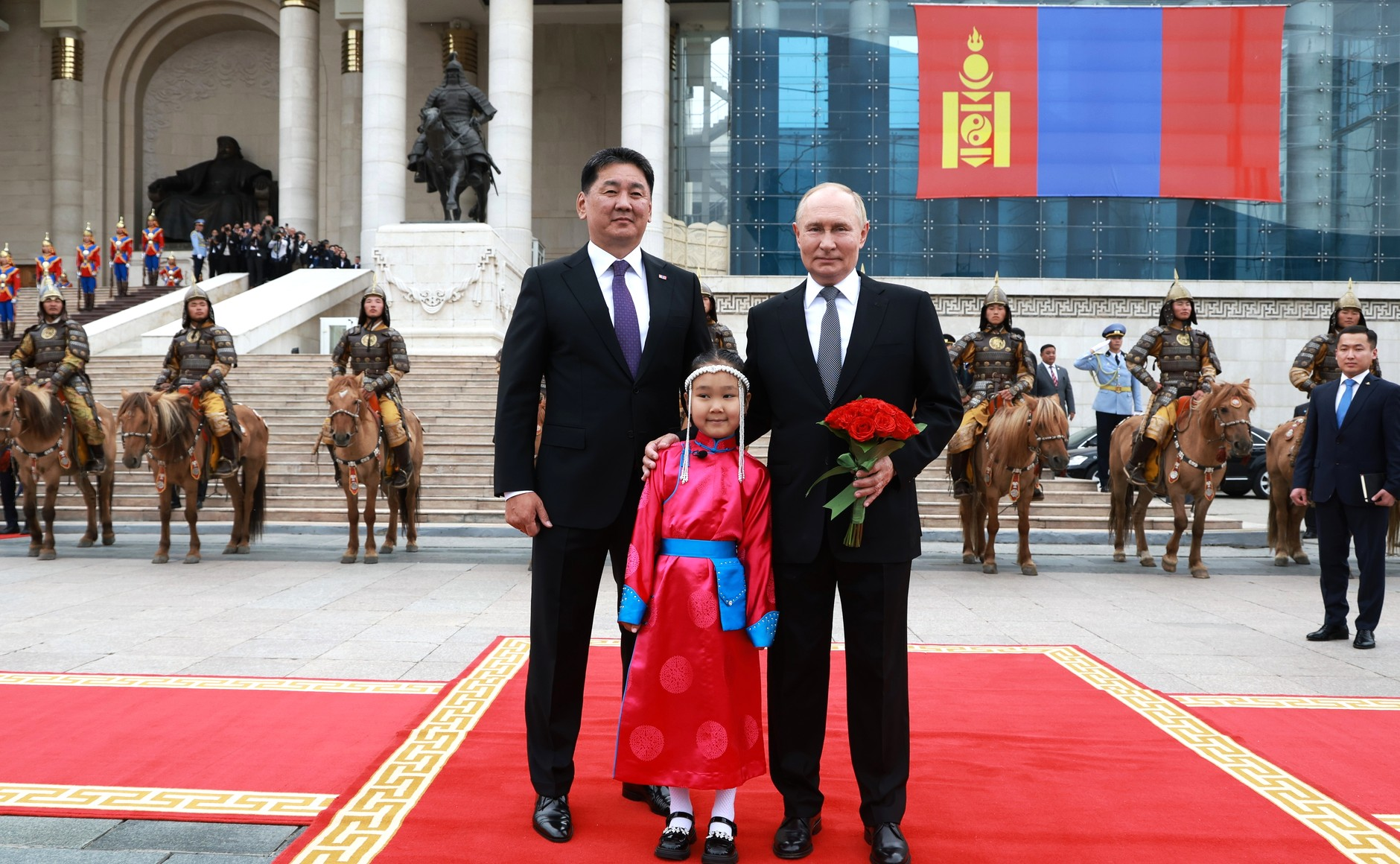
Putin with Mongolian president Ukhnaagiin Khürelsükh in Ulaanbaatar, Mongolia in September 2024. Mongolia was the first ICC member state to openly defy the court's arrest warrant for Putin.

On 17 March 2023, the International Criminal Court issued a warrant for Putin's arrest, alleging that Putin held criminal responsibility in the illegal deportation and transfer of children from Ukraine to Russia during the Russian invasion of Ukraine.

It was the first time that the ICC had issued an arrest warrant for the head of state of one of the five Permanent Members of the United Nations Security Council, (the world's five principal nuclear powers).

The ICC simultaneously issued an arrest warrant for Maria Lvova-Belova, Commissioner for Children's Rights in the Office of the President of the Russian Federation. Both are charged with:

:...the war crime of unlawful deportation of population (children) and that of unlawful transfer of population (children) from occupied areas of Ukraine to the Russian Federation,... ...for their publicized program, since 24 February 2022, of forced deportations of thousands of unaccompanied Ukrainian children to Russia, from areas of eastern Ukraine under Russian control.

Russia has maintained that the deportations were humanitarian efforts to protect orphans and other children abandoned in the conflict region.

=== 2023 Wagner rebellion ===
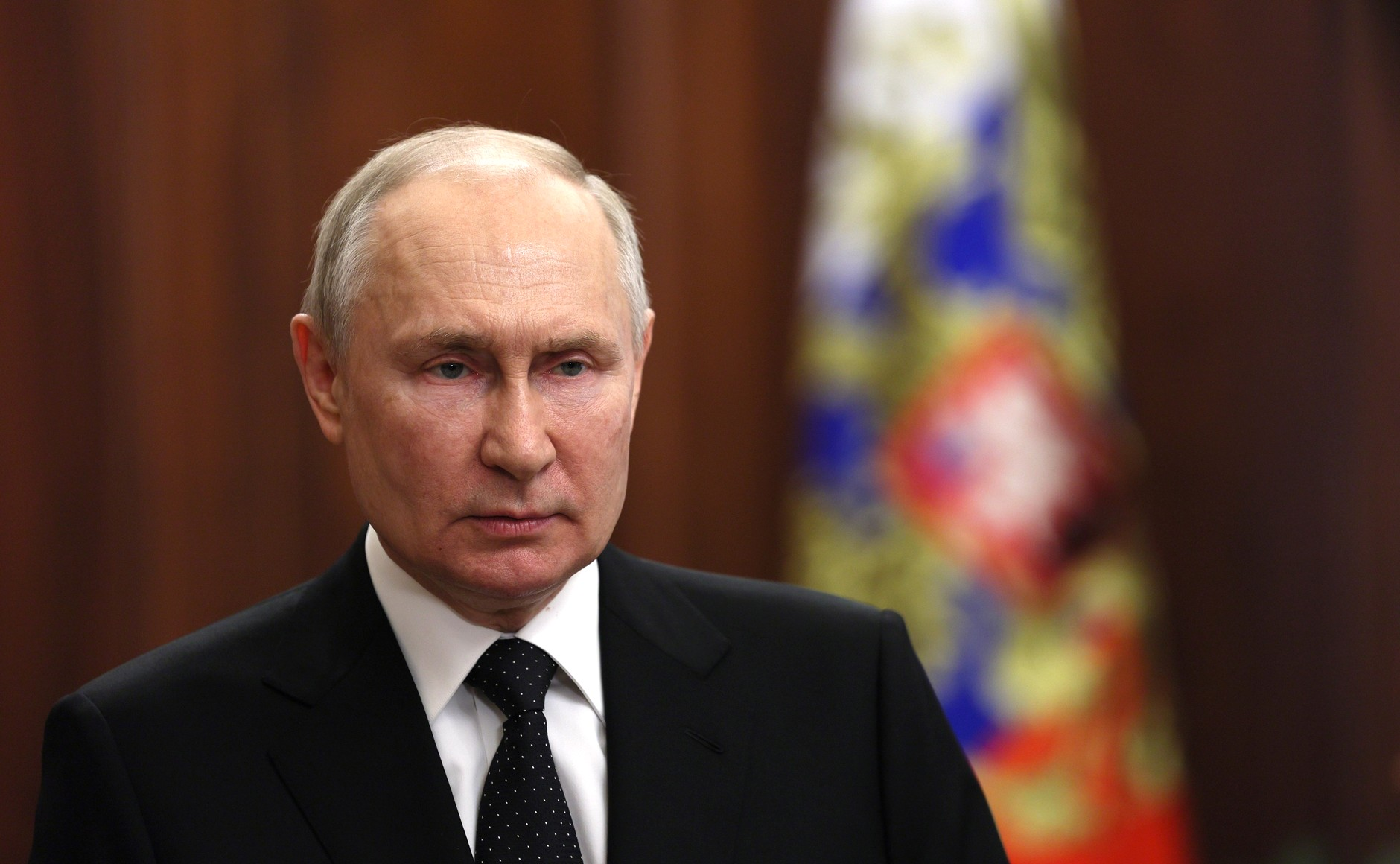
Putin making an address to the Russian people regarding Yevgeny Prigozhin's private military company Wagner Group rebellion on 24 June 2023

On 23 June 2023, the Wagner Group, a Russian paramilitary organization, rebelled against the government of Russia. The revolt arose amidst escalating tensions between the Russian Ministry of Defense and Yevgeny Prigozhin, the leader of Wagner.

Prigozhin portrayed the rebellion as a response to an alleged attack on his forces by the ministry. He dismissed the government's justification for invading Ukraine, blamed Defense Minister Sergei Shoigu for the country's military shortcomings, and accused him of waging the war for the benefit of Russian oligarchs. In a televised address on 24 June, Russian president Vladimir Putin denounced Wagner's actions as treason and pledged to quell the rebellion.

Prigozhin's forces seized control of Rostov-on-Don and the Southern Military District headquarters and advanced towards Moscow in an armored column. Following negotiations with Belarusian president Alexander Lukashenko, Prigozhin agreed to stand down and, late on 24 June, began withdrawing from Rostov-on-Don.

On 23 August 2023, exactly two months after the rebellion, Prigozhin was killed along with nine other people when a business jet crashed in Tver Oblast, north of Moscow. Western intelligence reported that the crash was probably caused by an explosion on board, and it is widely suspected that the Russian state were involved.

== 2024–present: Fifth presidential term ==
Putin's speech on the Crocus City Hall attack on 23 March 2024

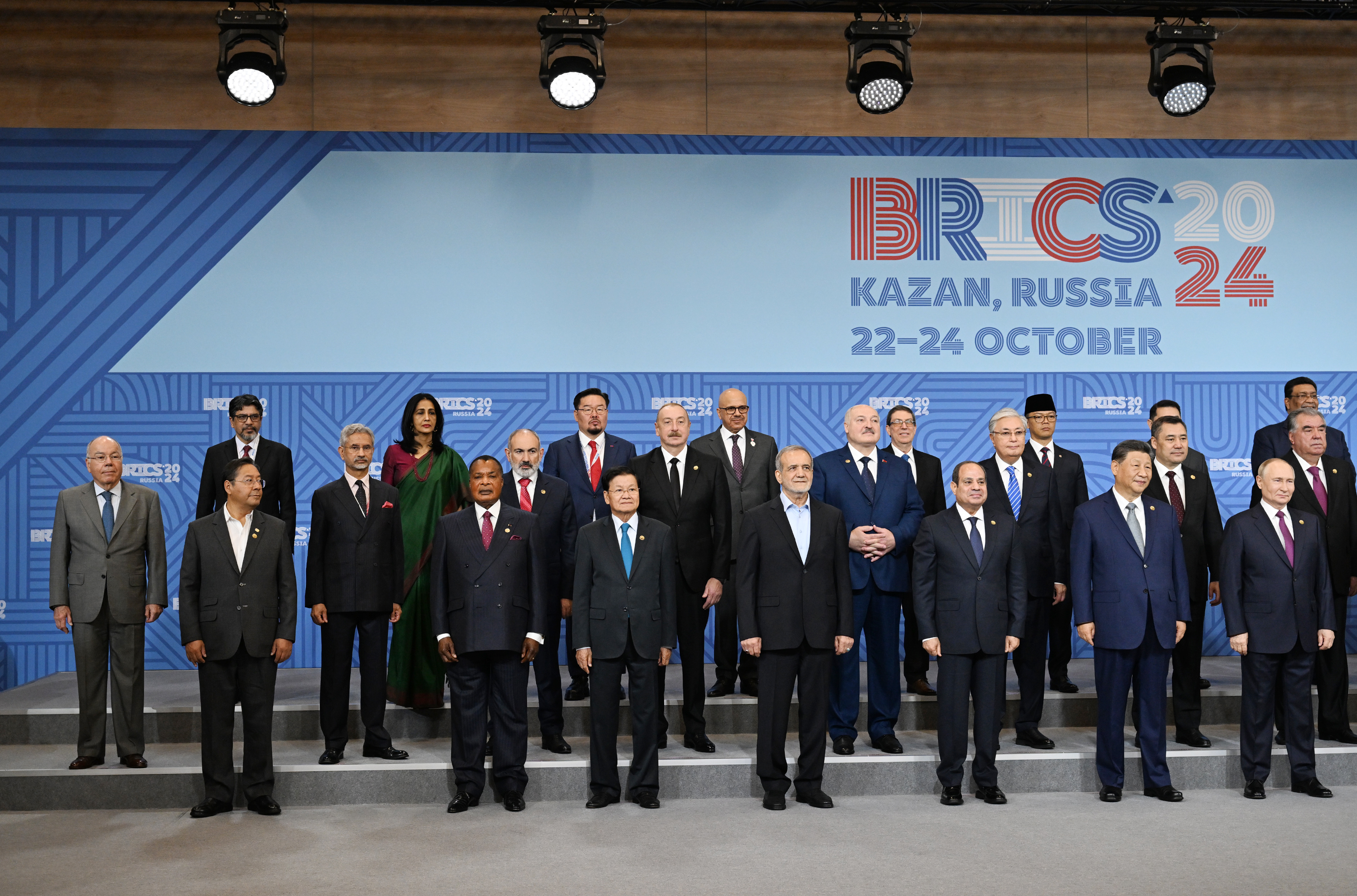
Putin with heads of delegations at the 16th BRICS summit in Kazan, Russia in October 2024

Putin won the 2024 Russian presidential election with 88% of the vote. International observers did not consider the election to be either free or fair, with Putin having increased political repressions after launching his full-scale war with Ukraine in 2022. The elections were also held in the Russian-occupied territories of Ukraine. There were reports of irregularities, including ballot stuffing and coercion, with statistical analysis suggesting unprecedented levels of fraud in the 2024 elections.

On 22 March 2024, the Crocus City Hall attack took place, causing the deaths of at least 145 people and injuring at least 551 more. It was the deadliest terrorist attack on Russian soil since the Beslan school siege in 2004.

On 7 May 2024, Putin was inaugurated as president of Russia for the fifth time. According to analysts, replacing Sergei Shoigu with Andrey Belousov as defense minister signals that Putin wants to transform the Russian economy into a war economy and is "preparing for many more years of war". In May 2024, four Russian sources told Reuters that Putin was ready to end the war in Ukraine with a negotiated ceasefire that would recognize Russia's war gains and freeze the war on current front lines, as Putin wanted to avoid unpopular steps such as further nationwide mobilization and increased war spending.

On 2 August 2024, Putin pardoned American journalist Evan Gershkovich, opposition figures Vladimir Kara-Murza, Ilya Yashin and others in a prisoner swap with western countries. The 2024 Ankara prisoner exchange was the most extensive prisoner exchange between Russia and United States since the end of the Cold War, involving the release of twenty-six people.

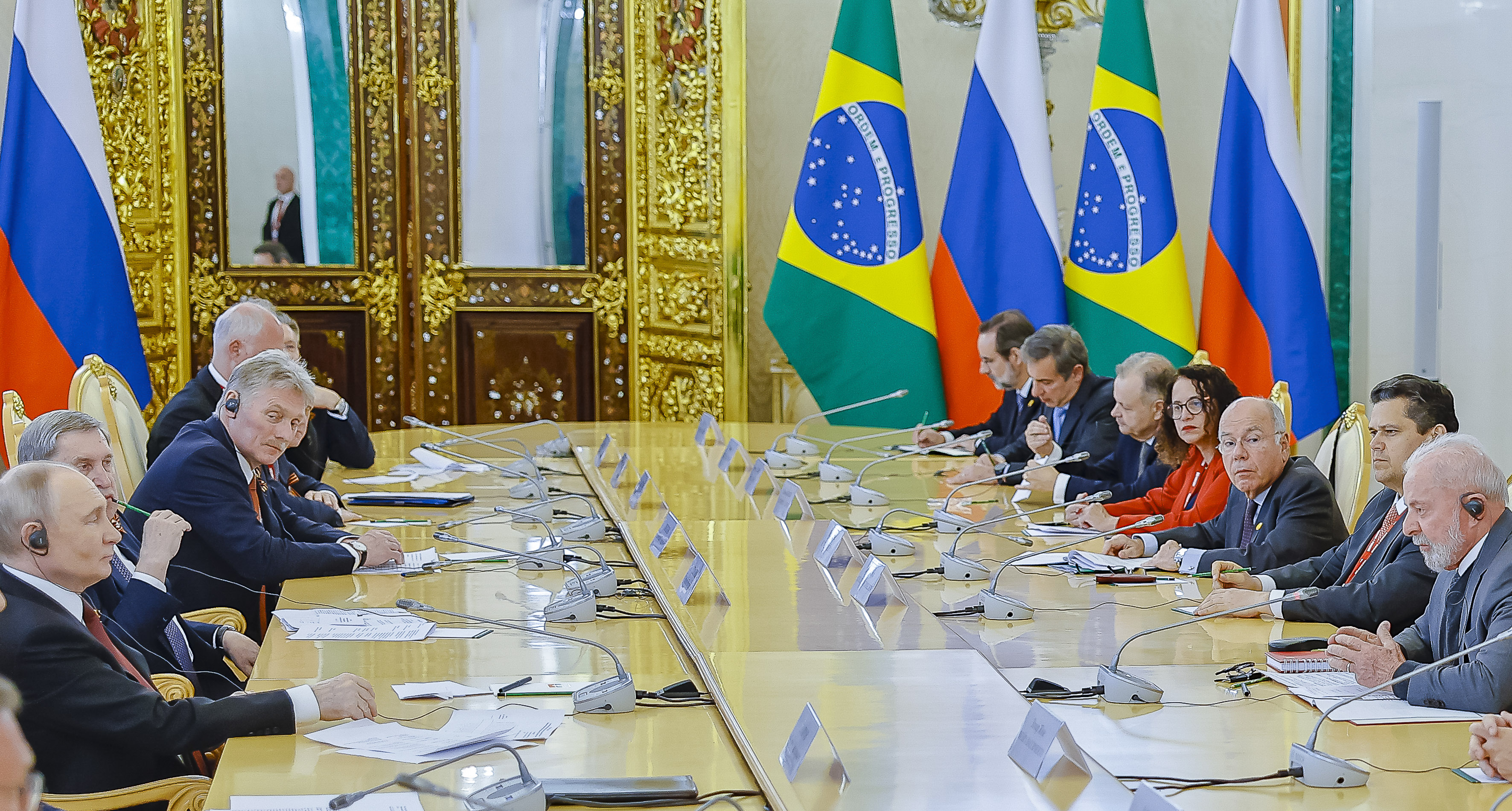
Putin meeting with Brazilian President Luiz Inácio Lula da Silva at the Kremlin on 9 May 2025, following the Victory Day parade

On 25 September 2024, Putin announced changes to Russia's nuclear doctrine, stating that an attack by a non-nuclear state supported by a nuclear power would be treated as a joint assault. He warned that Russia would consider using nuclear weapons if targeted with conventional weapons that threatened its sovereignty. The revision lowered the threshold for the potential use of Russia's nuclear arsenal, which, together with that of the United States, accounts for roughly 88% of the world's nuclear weapons. The announcement was part of a series of nuclear threats made by Putin since the invasion of Ukraine. According to analysts, the doctrine change was aimed at dissuading the United States, the United Kingdom, and France from permitting Ukraine to utilize Western-supplied long-range missiles, such as the Storm Shadow and ATACMS, for strikes inside Russian territory.

On 15 May 2025, Russian and Ukrainian delegations held direct talks in Istanbul for the first time since early 2022. As conditions for a peace agreement, Putin demanded that Ukraine cede four partially occupied regions that Russia had annexed but did not fully control, a condition Ukraine repeatedly rejected. Western officials and analysts stated that his broader demands would effectively undermine Ukraine's sovereignty and independence. Putin rejected calls for an unconditional ceasefire, and Russian forces subsequently escalated attacks against Ukraine.

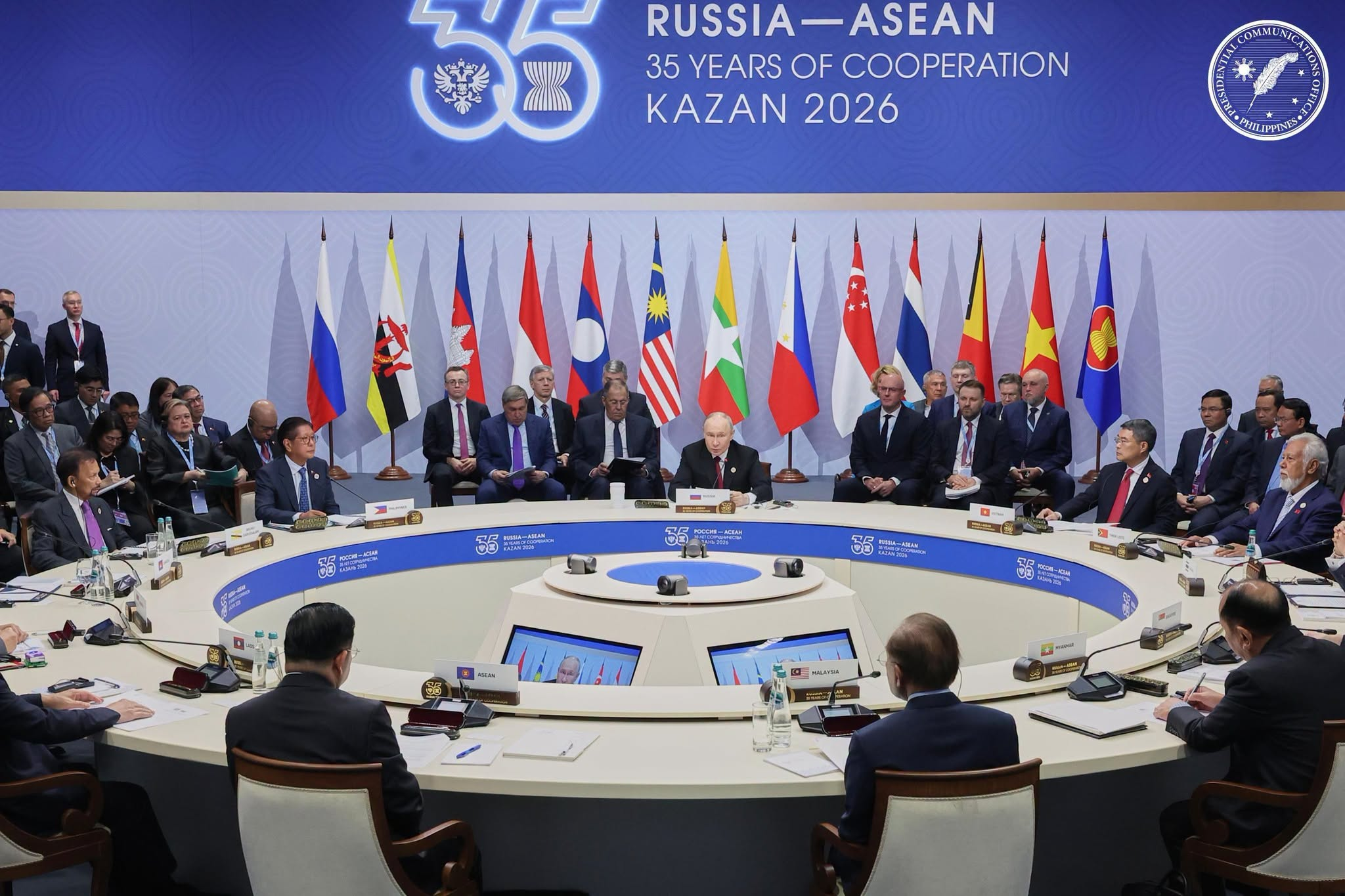
Putin and ASEAN leaders during the ASEAN–Russia Commemorative Summit in Kazan, Russia, 18 June 2026

On 22 June 2025, Putin condemned the U.S. strikes on Iranian nuclear sites as an "unprovoked act of aggression." At the same time, Russia launched a series of strikes against Ukraine. According to Western intelligence estimates, Russian military casualties had reached approximately one million by July 2025.

In October 2025, Putin stated that U.S. sanctions against Russia's largest oil companies, Rosneft and Lukoil, would not compel Russia to end the war. He reiterated that any peace agreement would require Ukraine to cede territory in the Donbas.

== See also ==
- List of Vladimir Putin legislation and programs
- Russia under Vladimir Putin
- Bibliography of Vladimir Putin
- Bibliography of Russian history (1991–present)
