= List of speeches given by Vladimir Putin =

Vladimir Putin has led Russian politics since 1999, either as Prime Minister or as President. During his political career, he has made a number of significant speeches.

== List ==
Year	Speech	Location
2000	First inauguration of Vladimir Putin	Grand Kremlin Palace, Moscow
2004	Second inauguration of Vladimir Putin	Grand Kremlin Palace, Moscow
2007	Munich speech of Vladimir Putin	Munich Security Conference, Munich, Germany
2012	Third inauguration of Vladimir Putin	Grand Kremlin Palace, Moscow
2014	Crimean speech of Vladimir Putin	Grand Kremlin Palace, Moscow
2014	Valdai speech of Vladimir Putin	Valdai Discussion Club, Sochi, Russia
2018	Fourth inauguration of Vladimir Putin	Grand Kremlin Palace, Moscow
2020	2020 Presidential Address to the Federal Assembly	Moscow Manege, Moscow, Russia
2022	Address concerning the events in Ukraine	Kremlin Senate, Moscow
2022	On conducting a special military operation	Kremlin Senate, Moscow
2022	2022 annexation speech of Vladimir Putin	Grand Kremlin Palace, Moscow
2022	2022 Moscow rally speech	Luzhniki Stadium, Moscow, Russia
2023	2023 Presidential Address to the Federal Assembly	Gostiny Dvor, Moscow, Russia

== See also ==
- Bibliography of Vladimir Putin
- Bibliography of Russian history (1991–present)
- Putinism
- Public image of Vladimir Putin
