= Annexation speech of Vladimir Putin =

Annexation speech of Vladimir Putin may refer to:

- Crimean speech of Vladimir Putin (2014)
- 2022 annexation speech of Vladimir Putin

== See also ==
- Speech of Vladimir Putin
