= 2007 Munich speech of Vladimir Putin =

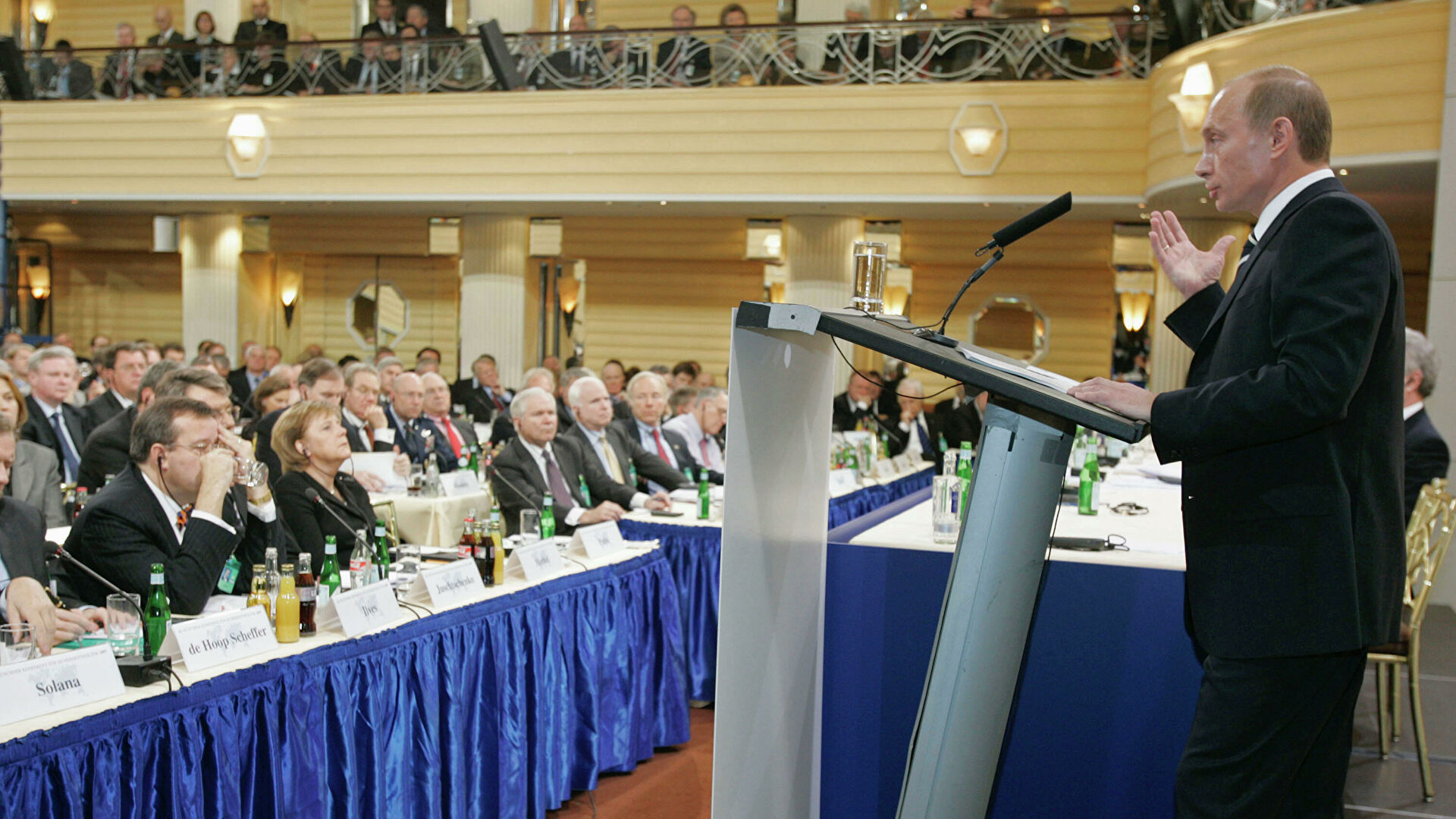
Putin at the 43rd Security Conference in Munich in 2007. To the left of his seat in the middle aisle: Angela Merkel, Viktor Yushchenko, Toomas Hendrik Ilves, Jaap de Hoop Scheffer, Javier Solana, to the right Robert Gates, John McCain, Joe Lieberman, Jon Kyl.

Putin's speech at the 43rd Munich Security Conference in 2007 was delivered on 10 February 2007, at the invitation of the Munich Conference's Chairman Horst Teltschik. It was the first speech by a Russian head of state at the Munich Conference. The main topics of his speech were criticism of the unipolar world order and of the role of the OSCE, NATO's eastward expansion, disarmament and the Iranian nuclear program. President Vladimir Putin's speech was seen as Russia's message to the West that it would not accept a subordinate role in international affairs. The speech heralded a significant change in Russian foreign policy and signaled a more assertive and independent stance on the international stage. Putin made it clear that Russia was ready to take a more active role in shaping the global order.

The speech came to be known in Russian as the Munich speech (Russian: Мюнхенская речь).

== Preparations ==
The invitation to Vladimir Putin was extended by Horst Teltschik, the long-time chairman of the Munich Security Conference. Teltschik had met with Putin on numerous occasions since 1999, including private meetings. In May 2006, Teltschik had visited Putin in Sochi privately and discussed the possibility of his participation. He proposed that Putin use the platform to present his position openly and candidly to an audience of significant international resonance. Regarding this conversation, he informed German Chancellor Angela Merkel in a lengthy letter but reportedly received no response. According to historian Peter Hoeres (de), Putin's key statement in the conversation, as recounted in the letter to Merkel (appended to Teltschik’s 2024 published diary), was: "First, the relationship between Russia and NATO must be clarified and further developed before Ukraine can join NATO, and not the other way around. Otherwise, NATO will be an enemy to Russia." Teltschik added a comment on Putin’s remark, calling it particularly noteworthy because it “signals Putin’s willingness to integrate Russia more closely into NATO—in a sense as compensation for Ukraine’s accession.”

Merkel had last met with Putin on January 21, 2007, in Sochi to personally outline her objectives for Germany's concurrent EU and G8 presidencies, which began on January 1. One of her goals was to renew the EU-Russia cooperation agreement, particularly on energy supply issues. In her 2024 autobiography, Merkel described the meeting with Putin as tense, marked by his accusations, particularly regarding the Iraq War and planned deployments of medium-range missiles, which Putin considered a direct threat to Russia. Merkel suggested Putin should address the matter directly with George W. Bush.

In the days leading up to the conference, Defence Minister Sergei Ivanov had strongly criticized NATO, particularly the United States. Ivanov had brought public attention to the dispute over U.S. plans to deploy missile defense systems in Eastern Europe, according to FAZ journalist Eckart Lohse.

The night before his speech, Putin met with Minister-President of Bavaria Edmund Stoiber at the Vier Jahreszeiten hotel in Munich. Ivanov and his son joined the meeting later.

Putin arrived in Munich with a delegation of 200 staff members. His convoy included a specially armored Mercedes S-Class vehicle, followed by other vehicles, including a ZiL limousine.

== Contents ==
At the beginning of his 32-minute speech on February 10, Putin stated that the format of the security conference allowed him to "escape 'excessive politeness,' avoid polished, pleasant, yet empty diplomatic platitudes," and speak his mind. He expressed hope that the conference chairman, Horst Teltschik, would not immediately "turn on the red light" and cut off his microphone.

=== Criticism of unipolar world order ===
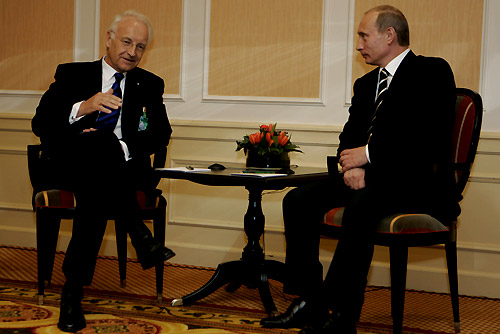
Stoiber and Putin

Putin emphasized the "comprehensive and indivisible nature of security", stating: "The security of one is the security of all." He quoted Franklin D. Roosevelt: "Wherever peace is broken, it is simultaneously threatened everywhere."

This led Putin to his sharp critique of the unipolar world order and U.S. dominance, which he argued endangered global peace after the Cold War's balance of power had collapsed. Putin criticized what he called the United States' monopolistic dominance in the world, and its "almost uncontained hypertrophied use of force in international relations". According to Putin, the result of such dominance was that "no one feels safe! Because no one can feel that international law is like a stone wall that will protect them. Of course such a policy stimulates an arms race." He questioned the legitimacy of such a system: "A unipolar model is not only unacceptable but impossible in today’s world," claiming it breeds instability by disregarding other nations' sovereignty, destabilizing global security. He warned that this unsustainable system forces nations to arm themselves, including nuclear proliferation, referencing Iran’s nuclear program.

A unipolar world means one center of power, one center of force, one center of decision-making. This is unacceptable for the world. It is destructive, even for the hegemon itself.

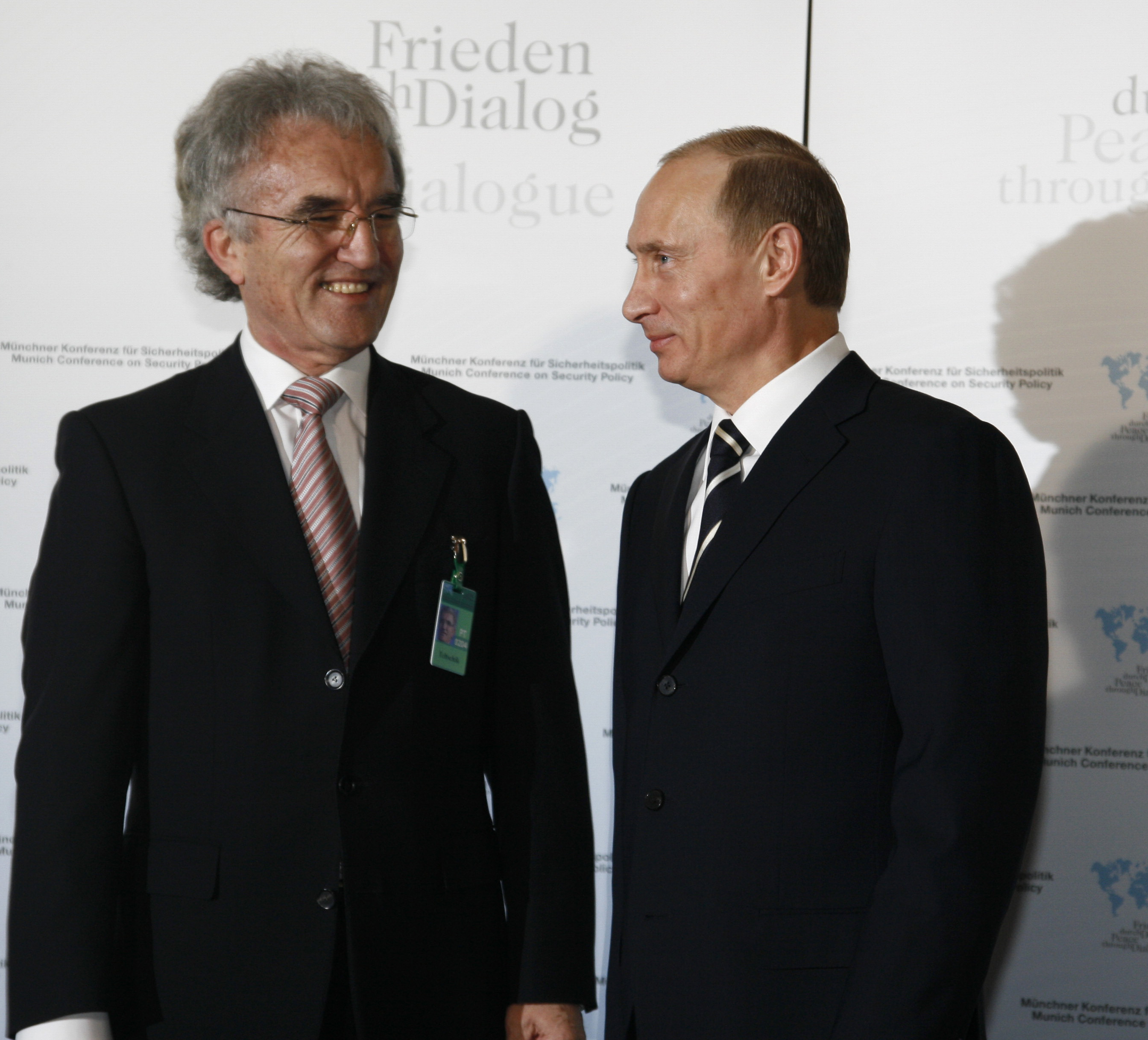
Teltschik and Putin

Putin declared the "unipolar model" morally and ethically untenable. He cautioned the EU and NATO against unilateral conflict resolution, citing "unrestrained use of force" and erosion of international law. Only the United Nations Charter should govern military action, he argued, rejecting replacements by the EU or NATO.

=== Role of poverty ===
Putin identified global poverty as a key security threat but criticized aid programs where donor countries’ corporations "pocket the money". He condemned developed nations for maintaining agricultural subsidies: "Let’s call a spade a spade: With one hand, they offer ‘charity,’ while with the other, they preserve economic backwardness and rake in profits."

=== Role of OSCE and NGOs ===
Putin accused the OSCE of becoming a U.S. tool to interfere in member states’ internal affairs. He claimed its bureaucracy and decision-making processes were disconnected from member nations. Similarly, he alleged that foreign-funded NGOs, though formally independent, served as instruments of external control.

=== Military interventions ===
Putin criticized U.S.-led military interventions conducted without international consensus or legal justification, arguing they fuel chaos rather than stability:

We see growing disregard for international law’s basic principles. One state—the United States—has overstepped its national boundaries in every sphere.

=== Militarization of outer space ===
Putin warned that militarizing outer space risked unpredictable consequences. He highlighted Russia’s initiatives for treaties banning space-based weapons.

=== Disarmament ===
Start of Putin's speech

Putin criticized NATO states for refusing to ratify the Adapted Conventional Armed Forces in Europe Treaty concluded in 1999, saying: "Seven years have passed and only four states have ratified this document, including the Russian Federation, while NATO establishes so-called light U.S. forward bases in Bulgaria and Romania". He accused NATO of moving combat forces closer to Russia’s borders despite Russia's adherence to the treaty. Russia would later suspend its participation in the treaty in July 2007.

=== Criticism of U.S. missile defense shield ===
Putin opposed U.S. plans for a missile defense system in Poland and the Czech Republic, dismissing its stated purpose of countering Iran. He argued Iranian missiles lacked the range to threaten Europe and warned the system targeted Russia, risking a new arms race. Putin also publicly opposed plans for the U.S. missile shield in Europe, and presented President George W. Bush with a counter proposal on 7 June 2007, which was declined.

=== NATO expansion and security concerns ===
With NATO only a year away from inviting Ukraine and Georgia in 2008 to become NATO member-states, Putin emphasized how Russia perceived the alliance's previous and projected eastward expansion as a threat: "I think it is obvious that NATO expansion does not have any relation with the modernisation of the Alliance itself or with ensuring security in Europe. On the contrary, it represents a serious provocation that reduces the level of mutual trust. And we have the right to ask: against whom is this expansion intended? And what happened to the assurances our western partners made after the dissolution of the Warsaw Pact? Where are those declarations today? No one even remembers them." Putin called NATO’s eastward expansion a "provocative" move undermining trust. He claimed NATO’s military infrastructure near Russia’s borders contradicted post-Warsaw Pact assurances that the alliance would not expand eastward. Citing former NATO Secretary General Manfred Wörner, Putin stated: "The fact that we are ready not to station NATO forces beyond Germany’s borders gives the Soviet Union firm security guarantees." He warned against NATO’s "unrestrained military ambition" and accused the alliance of imposing its will on others.

=== Energy policy ===
Putin characterized Russia as a reliable energy supplier, urging against using energy as political leverage: "We are not an enemy but a partner," advocating transparent and fair energy policies.

=== Call for a multipolar world ===
Putin advocated a multipolar world with multiple power centers cooperating under international law and the UN. He stressed mutual respect and sovereignty as foundations for stability: "Only through joint efforts can we address modern challenges."

== Discussion ==
After Putin’s speech, Horst Teltschik (Conference Chairman) thanked him for his "important address", noting that it introduced "new themes" such as disarmament, arms control, NATO-Russia relations, technological cooperation, and the concept of a "global security architecture"—a topic Teltschik remarked had "not been a priority in recent years". He then opened a 30-minute Q&A session, during which eight questions were posed:

1. Markus Meckel (German politician), challenged Putin’s skepticism of NATO enlargement, arguing that the alliance's expansion reflected the democratic choices of Eastern European states and enhanced regional security. He criticized Russia’s restrictive laws on NGOs and its record of journalist killings, citing the murder of Anna Politkovskaya.

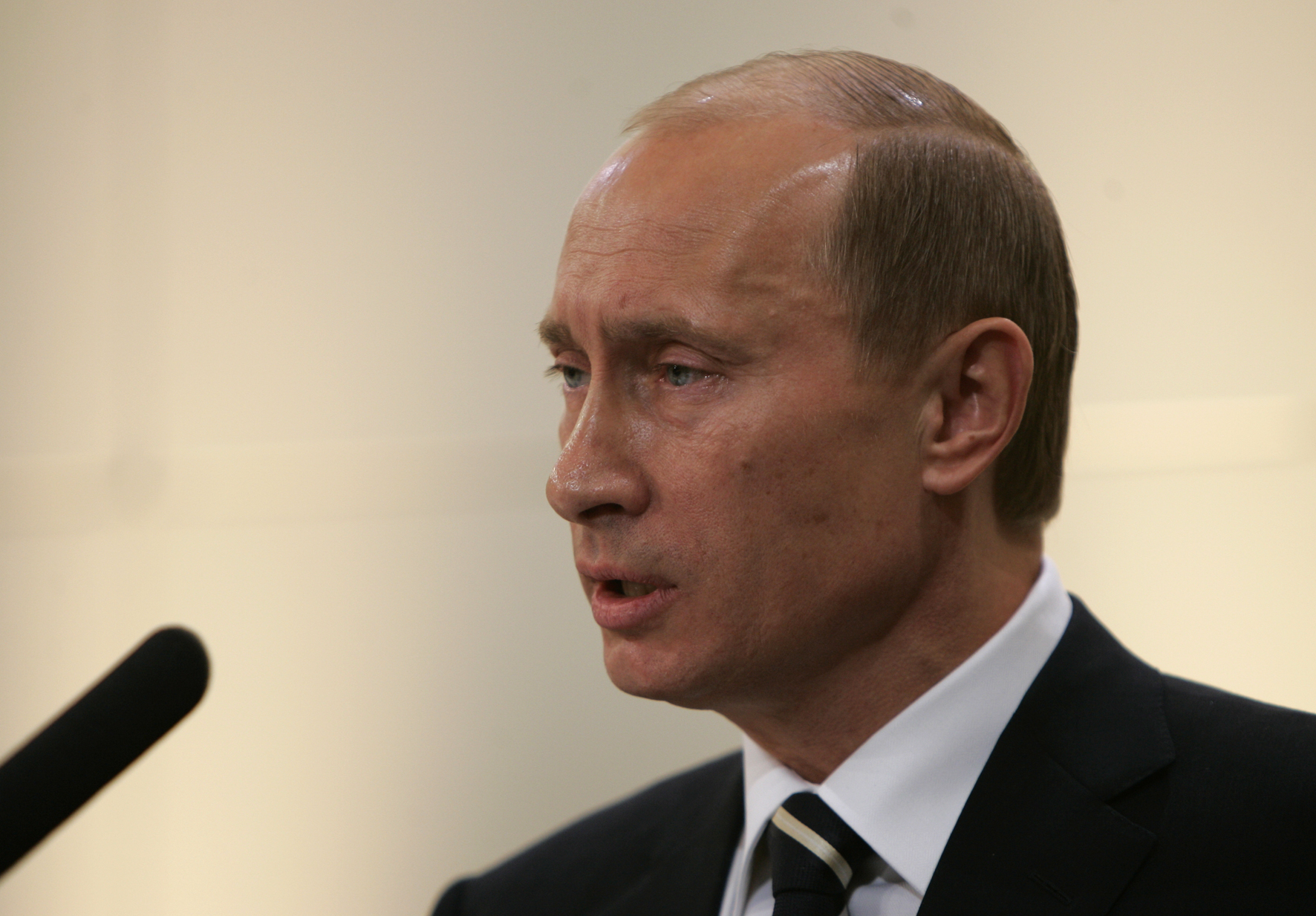
Putin during his speech

In his answer Putin acknowledged the right of sovereign states to self-determination but asserted that NATO’s military infrastructure expansion—such as establishing bases in Bulgaria and Romania—was unrelated to modern threats like terrorism. He emphasized that Russia had adhered to the 1999 Adapted Conventional Armed Forces in Europe (CFE) Treaty, while NATO states refused ratification. On NGOs, he accused foreign governments of using them to secretly finance political activities, undermining democratic processes. Regarding journalists, he noted that most killings occurred in conflict zones like Iraq and vowed prosecution in Russia.

2. Johnny Isakson (U.S. senator) stressed the need to secure nuclear materials amid rising terrorism, urging stronger non-proliferation measures.

Putin highlighted Russia’s 2006 proposal for international uranium enrichment centers under IAEA supervision, which he claimed aligned with later U.S. initiatives. He cited Russia’s strict compliance with the Nuclear Non-Proliferation Treaty (NPT) and urged reciprocity from NATO states in ratifying arms control agreements.

3. German Ruprecht Polenz (German politician) asked Putin’s position on Kosovo’s potential independence and UN envoy Martti Ahtisaari’s plan for supervised sovereignty.

Putin rejected external imposition of Kosovo’s status, warning it would set a precedent for separatist conflicts globally. He insisted that only Serbs and Kosovars could negotiate a solution, emphasizing that forced outcomes risked destabilizing the Balkans.

4. Stefan Kornelius (journalist for Süddeutsche Zeitung) asked about lessons from Russia’s military campaign in Chechnya and whether Putin would guarantee energy supply security in an EU-Russia partnership agreement.

Putin detailed Chechnya’s post-conflict stabilization, noting the 2006 election of President Ramzan Kadyrov and the integration of former militants into local governance. He criticized the Energy Charter Treaty for excluding Russia from European nuclear energy markets but highlighted the 2006 five-year gas transit agreement with Ukraine, which stabilized EU supplies.

5. Jane Harman (U.S. congresswoman) pressed Putin on Russia’s efforts to prevent Iran from developing nuclear weapons, given its missile technology exports.

Putin dismissed Iran’s missile capabilities as non-threatening to Europe, citing Defense Minister Sergei Ivanov’s clarification that Iranian missiles had a maximum range of 1,600–1,700 km. He attributed Iran’s technology to leaks from European and Asian states, not Russia, and advocated incentives (e.g., civilian nuclear cooperation) over sanctions to secure Tehran’s compliance.

6. Josef Joffe (editor of Die Zeit) accused Russia of blocking stronger sanctions against Iran and supplying advanced weapons (e.g., anti-tank systems) that ended up in Lebanon and Gaza.

Putin denied significant arms transfers to Iran, calling military cooperation “minimal.” He acknowledged Syrian forces had left Russian-made Metis-M anti-tank missiles in Lebanon but asserted new safeguards—including warehouse inspections—prevented misuse. He quipped that Kalashnikovs in Gaza were “the world’s most common rifles.”

7. Senator Jon Kyl (U.S. senator) criticized Russia’s development of the Topol-M intercontinental ballistic missile and demanded a pledge against unilateral military action.

Putin characterized the Topol-M as an “asymmetric response” to U.S. missile defense plans in Europe, which he argued could neutralize Russia’s nuclear deterrent. Citing Article 51 of the UN Charter, he affirmed Russia’s right to self-defense without prior UN approval but stressed adherence to international law.

8. Kenneth Roth (Executive director of Human Rights Watch) questioned Russia’s reliability as an energy partner given its centralized governance and suppression of political dissent.

Putin cited Russia’s multi-party parliament, including opposition factions like the Communist Party and Liberal Democratic Party (LDPR), as evidence of pluralism. He highlighted long-term energy deals, such as Gazprom’s 2006 asset-swap agreement with Germany’s BASF, as proof of transparency. He mocked Europe’s “hypocrisy” in restricting Russian access to nuclear markets while demanding energy concessions.

== After the speech ==
After the speech, Chancellor Merkel met with Putin for a private conversation. According to Die Welt, the tone of the conversation was pleasant. The mood was said to have relaxed. Putin invited CSU leader Edmund Stoiber to a farewell visit to Moscow. According to Die Welt, the two got on so well that they started to use the informal German “du” form.

In the evening, according to La Stampa, Putin renewed his "attack" on Al Jazeera, where he stated that the American intervention had caused more damage to Iraq than Saddam's dictatorship. In the evening, the White House also reacted through its spokesman Gordon Johndroe: "We are surprised and disappointed by President Putin's statements. His accusations are false. We expect to continue cooperation with Russia in areas important to the international community, such as combating terrorism and reducing the proliferation and threat of weapons of mass destruction."

Regarding Arturo Parisi's misunderstanding, Putin had said: "Perhaps I misunderstood the Italian Minister of Defence when he said that the UN, the EU and NATO were the international organisations that could legitimise the use of force. We believe that only the UN can do that." Parisi replied, according to La Stampa : "We agree. It was a misunderstanding that was immediately clarified."

== Reception ==
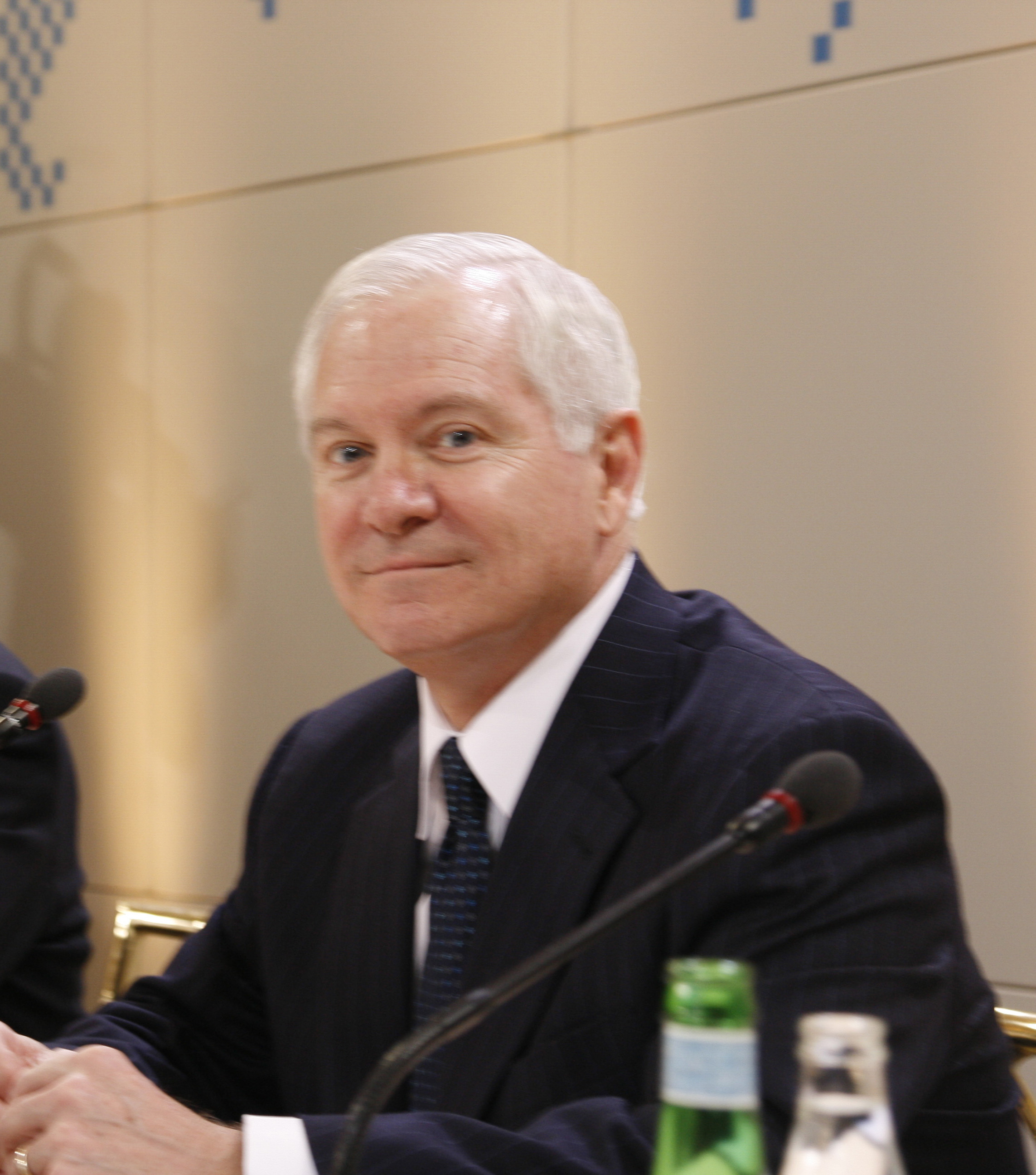
Robert Gates

U.S. Secretary of Defence Robert Gates reacted by saying, "Nobody wants a new Cold War with Russia". In his speech the following day he said that many of those listening had a diplomatic or political background, and like the second speaker yesterday, Putin, he himself had a career in the espionage business. "And I guess old spies have a habit of speaking bluntly. However, I have been to re-education-camp – spending four and a half years as a university president and dealing with faculty." Gates expressed concerns about Russian arms deliveries. Russia might be tempted to use energy resources for political purposes, which could endanger international stability. However, he saw common problems and challenges that needed to be addressed in partnership with other countries, including Russia.

Gates explained that NATO had not simply “triumphed” over the Warsaw Pact at the turning point in world politics in 1989/91. The ideas of freedom and human rights had proved their appeal and their primacy over the powers of oppression and lack of freedom. Gates also expressly distanced himself from outdated distinctions between "old" and "new" Europe, "with which his predecessor Rumsfeld had repeatedly angered NATO partners on this side of the Atlantic". Gates reacted calmly and astonished to Putin's accusations and mentioned the invitation to Moscow that Putin and Defence Minister Ivanov had extended to him.

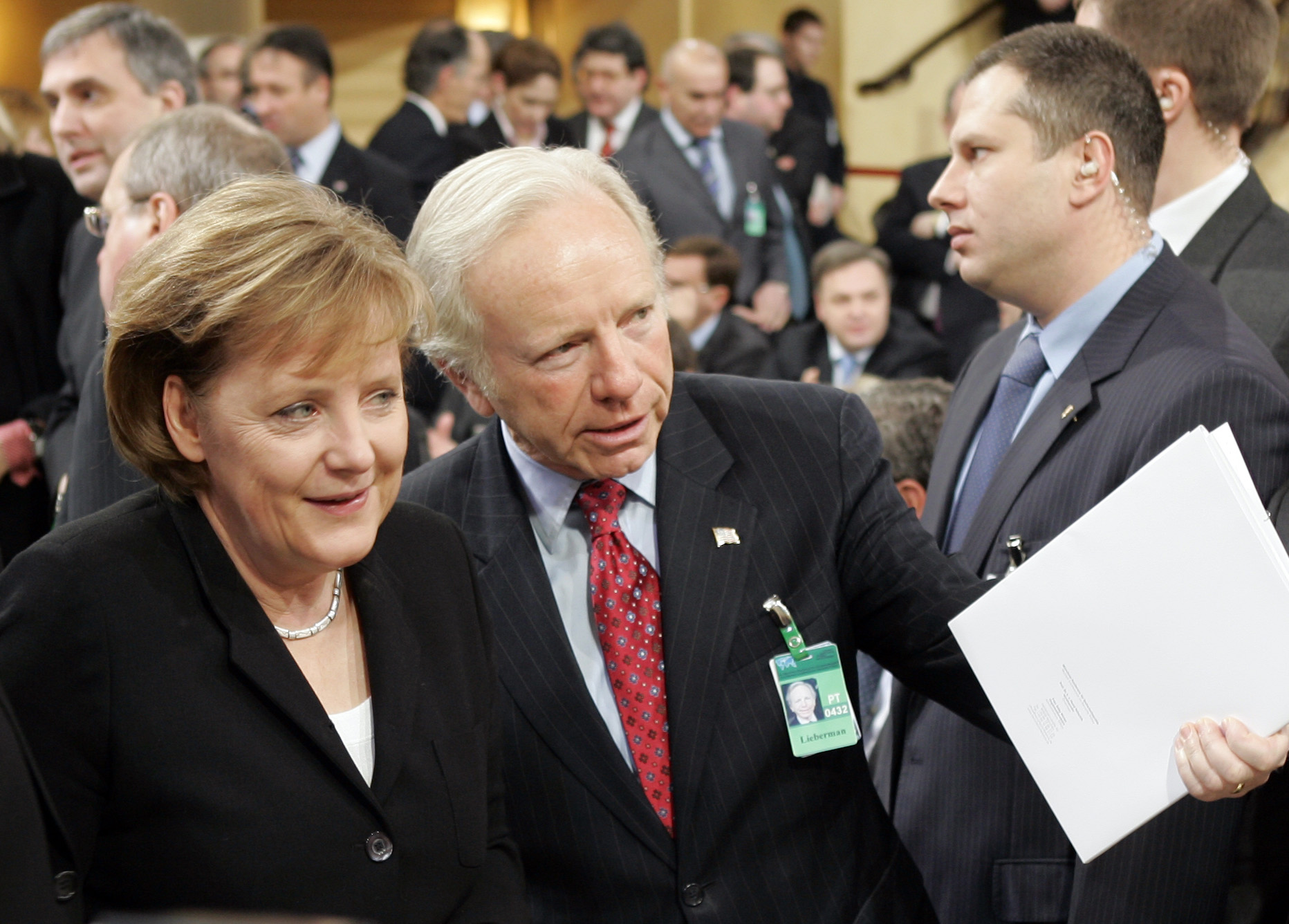
Lieberman with Merkel

U.S. Senator Joe Lieberman said that the speech was "provocative" and marked by "rhetoric that sounded more like the Cold War". The incumbent Secretary General of NATO at the time, Jaap de Hoop Scheffer, called it "disappointing and not helpful". The months following the Munich speech were marked by tension and a surge in rhetoric on both sides of the Atlantic. Both Russian and American officials, however, denied the idea of a new Cold War.

The Polish Institute of International Affairs described Putin's quotation from Manfred Wörner's speech as lacking appropriate context, stating that Wörner's speech "only concerned non-deployment of NATO forces on East German territory after reunification".

== Panel (11 February 2007) ==
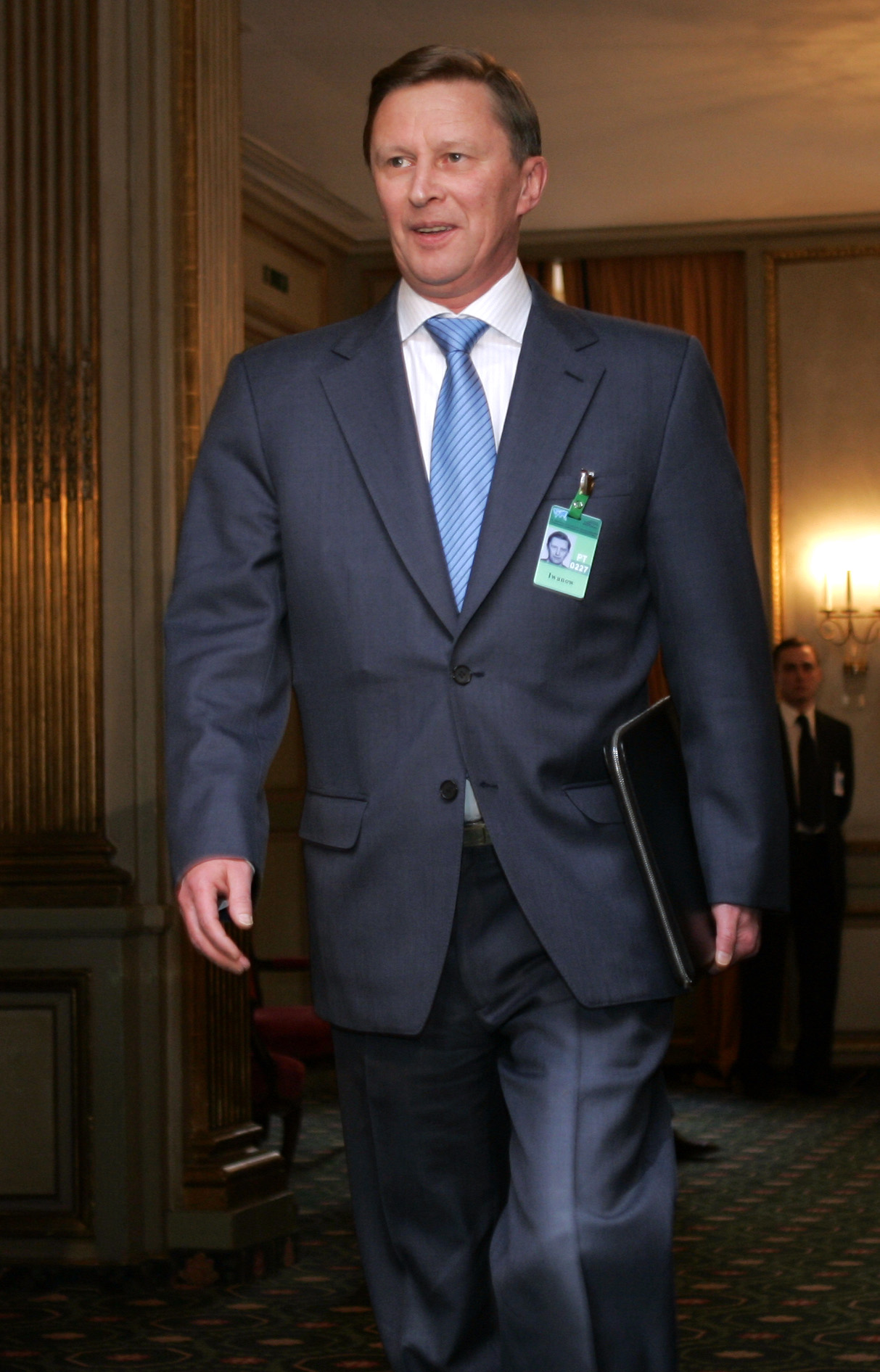
Russian Deputy Prime Minister and Minister of Defence Sergei Ivanov

At the panel following the 43rd Munich Security Conference, Foreign Minister Ivanov said that Putin's speech had merely "reminded" the international community that the United States and NATO had broken what he claimed was a commitment made over ten years ago not to expand NATO to Russia's borders. He also said that Russia's views would not be imposed on other countries, and that Russia had no intention of provoking a second Cold War. Ivanov also outlined the increase in US military spending in recent years, which had doubled the Cold War peak, while Russia's military spending was about 2.7 percent of GDP, far from the nearly 30 percent of the Soviet Union during the Cold War.

== Stephen Hadley's visit to Moscow (22 February 2007) ==
On February 22, 2007, U.S. national security advisor Stephen Hadley visited Moscow and met first with the secretary of the Russian Security Council, former foreign minister Igor Sergeyevich Ivanov, and later with first deputy prime minister Sergei Ivanov and Dmitry Medvedev. According to the NZZ, Igor Ivanov stressed that overcoming the challenges posed by international terrorism, the proliferation of weapons of mass destruction and unresolved regional conflicts would depend on the effectiveness of cooperation between the USA and Russia. Hadley pointed out a number of issues on which there is agreement. Topics included the nuclear dispute with Iran, North Korea, Kosovo and the situation in Iraq and Afghanistan. Igor Ivanov attached particular importance to an intensive, still developing dialogue in order to counteract irritations. Sergei Ivanov made similar comments. Moscow paid particular attention to the American missile defense plans, although Hadley asserted that the defense batteries were not intended to be used against Russian missiles. Hadley could not understand why high-ranking Russian military officials wanted to terminate the treaty on the elimination of medium- and short-range missiles because of this missile defense and recalled the importance of this treaty for security in Europe. The NZZ commented: "This does not seem to have allayed Russia's fears of coming up short in the balance of terror."

== Legacy ==
=== War in Georgia ===
In 2016, Fiona Hill discussed the relationship between Putin's statements in 2007 and 2008 and the war in Georgia:

Putin stated at the time that even the slightest indication that Ukraine and Georgia intended to join NATO would constitute a "red line" for Russia. In the West, this was largely interpreted as an empty threat.

Hill further argued that the war in August 2008 was not widely interpreted by the United States and NATO as a clear signal of Russia's intentions, in part due to the role of Mikheil Saakashvili in the conflict:

Nevertheless, the war became a turning point in relations between Russia and the West because it demonstrated that Putin was prepared to use military force if Moscow believed that its most important security interests in a particular issue had not been adequately taken into account.

=== War in Ukraine ===
Both during the run-up to and shortly after, the launch of the 2022 Russian invasion of Ukraine, the speech was revisited with some political analysts and commentators arguing it to have been a revelation of Putin's intentions that was at the time misread by the West and not taken seriously enough. According to Andrew A. Michta's opinion published by The Wall Street Journal in August 2022, Western leaders had failed in 2007 to recognize the speech "amounted to a declaration of war on the West."

== Scholarship and journalism ==
=== Richard Sakwa (2014) ===
British scholar of Russian politics Richard Sakwa argued that Putin’s speech expressed profound disappointment. Sakwa highlighted examples of Russia’s exclusion from decision-making processes, the rejection of its claim to an independent foreign policy, and Western insensitivity toward Russia’s perspectives. He referenced a report by OSCE Chairman William H. Hill (1999–2006), who criticized Russia’s systematic exclusion from negotiations over Transnistria. Sakwa noted that U.S. policies of exceptionalism and arrogance had also been critiqued by Robert Gates and Angela Stent, with Stent emphasizing areas for constructive U.S.-Russia cooperation.

=== Robert Gates (2014) ===
In his autobiography, Duty, Robert Gates offers his assessment of Russian-American relations, some of which he already held at the time of the conference. After recounting the official message to Bush, Gates notes: "What I didn't tell the president was that I believe relations with Russia after 1993 had been badly managed."

Gates mentions that despite the great success of Gorbachev's approval of reunification, the former Eastern Bloc countries were admitted to NATO far too quickly. In addition, he argues, there was the "unnecessary provocation" of the US agreements with the Romanian and Bulgarian governments to rotate troops through bases in those countries, and the disregard of Russia's historical ties to Serbia. The attempt to bring Georgia and Ukraine into NATO went too far. The expansion of NATO undermined the purpose of the alliance, he argued, because it was a political act rather than a carefully considered military one, a "reckless disregard for what Russians viewed as their own vital national interests." Putin's hatred of the Treaty on Conventional Armed Forces was understandable, as it was negotiated at a time of Russia's weakness and hampered troop movements on its own territory. At a time of Russia's weakness, Russia's interests were not taken seriously enough, and there was little ability to take its perspective and manage the relationship for the long term.

=== William H. Hill (2018) ===
In No Place for Russia – European Security Institutions since 1989, OSCE diplomat William H. Hill emphasised that the essence of Putin's and Russia's position was expressed most clearly in his 2007 speech, in which all points of complaint were named and openly addressed in a long list. Hill sees a clear link between Putin's criticism of the OSCE as an instrument of US foreign policy and its observation of elections and human rights activities. The end of co-operation did not end with Putin's announcement of a new Russian policy, even if he had run out of patience at the beginning of 2007. Hill cites the repayment of debts to the IMF and Paris Club and the remarkable economic growth as reasons for Putin's increased self-confidence, which also justified a different behaviour in the eyes of the Russian elite. The speech thus represents a kind of declaration of independence, not a declaration of resistance or hostility. Hill also explains Putin's dissatisfaction with the CFE Treaty by the fact that the new NATO members were not party to the treaty, and that NATO refused to ratify the ACFE Treaty because Russia stationed troop contingents in Moldova, which led to Russia's 150-day deadline in mid-July and Russia's withdrawal in December of that year.

=== William Joseph Burns (2019) ===
The Back Channel, the autobiography of U.S. ambassador to Russia William J. Burns, focuses on the evolution of U.S.–Russian relations. According to Burns, Putin, in his bitter criticism of U.S. unilateralism, essentially pulled together everything he had previously said on the subject. After the speech, Burns wrote an email to Condoleezza Rice in which he sought to explain the Russian mindset. He wrote:

The Munich speech ... was the self-absorbed product of fifteen years of accumulated Russian frustrations and grievances, amplified by Putin’s own sense that Russia’s concerns are still often taken for granted or ignored.(p. 224)

In Burns’s view, Putin’s criticism satisfied Russian expectations that the USA should be addressed with greater self-confidence, while also diverting attention from domestic political difficulties. At the same time, Putin was also expressing deeply held convictions. Emphasizing the psychological dimension of the relationship—frustrations, perceived lack of respect, paranoia, and the “dizziness of success”—Burns notes that both before and after the speech he urged the U.S. government to take Russia’s concerns more seriously:

I had done my best over the previous two and a half years to signal the brewing problems in the relationship and what might be done to head them off. I knew I was straining the patience of some in Washington, who chafed at my warnings of troubles to come when they were consumed with the challenges that had already arrived.

He warned of serious consequences arising from NATO’s eastward expansion to include Ukraine and Georgia:

Ukrainian entry into NATO is the brightest of all redlines for the Russian elite (not just Putin). In more than two and a half years of conversations with key Russian players, from knuckle-draggers in the dark recesses of the Kremlin to Putin’s sharpest liberal critics, I have yet to find anyone who views Ukraine in NATO as anything other than a direct challenge to Russian interests. At this stage, a MAP offer would be seen not as a technical step along a long road toward membership, but as throwing down the strategic gauntlet. Today’s Russia will respond. Russian-Ukrainian relations will go into a deep freeze. . . . It will create fertile soil for Russian meddling in Crimea and eastern Ukraine. (letter to Condoleeza Rice, February 2008)

=== Horst Teltschik (2019) ===
In Chapter 10 of his book Russisches Roulette: Vom Kalten Krieg zum Kalten Frieden (2018), closest advisor to chancellor Helmut Kohl and political analyst Horst Teltschik provided a detailed analysis of Putin’s speech, contextualizing it within developments from 1989 to 2018. Drawing on personal encounters with Putin, Teltschik interpreted the address as reflecting deep frustration. He criticized media coverage for selectively quoting the speech, omitting key themes, and failing to engage with Putin’s overtures for dialogue. Teltschik argued that Russia’s primary concerns were security and retaining its status as an independent power center. He viewed NATO-Russia tensions as a product of a “spiral of mutual distrust,” with Moscow consistently signaling openness to cooperation. Teltschik blamed NATO and EU leaders for inflexibility during the “critical period of 2007/08,” accusing them of pursuing a rigid strategy that assumed Russia would capitulate to Western pressure. He cited failures such as NATO states’ refusal to ratify the CFE Treaty and the 1999 NATO intervention in Yugoslavia without UN approval as exacerbating confrontation. Renate Nimtz-Köster, reviewing the book in the Süddeutsche Zeitung (26 February 2019), criticized Teltschik for portraying Ukraine as “dysfunctional,” overstating Russia’s democratic achievements, and downplaying Moscow’s responsibility for tensions. She noted Teltschik’s assertion that NATO’s Cold War success stemmed from a “dual strategy of strength and détente since the late 1960s.” Lutz Lichtenberger (Die Zeit, 26 April 2019) praised the book for urging NATO and the U.S. to adopt a more effective approach toward Moscow. He highlighted Teltschik’s invocation of John F. Kennedy’s strategy: “First, understand the adversary’s interests. Does anyone truly believe Russia will concede without reciprocity?”

=== Philip Short (2022) ===
Putin biographer Philip Short noted in Time (3 August 2022) that while American politicians reacted with outrage to Putin’s 2007 Munich speech, he had said little he had not said before—only the tone had changed. Short observed:

What Putin had called the “false foundation” of U.S.-Russia relations—the pretense that all was well and that Russia and America were solid strategic partners with only minor tactical differences—had been discarded.

Short quoted from U.S. diplomat Bill Burns’ cable to the White House summarizing Putin’s message: “We’re back, and you’d better get used to it!” According to Short, Putin concluded the U.S. would only heed Russia’s concerns after a “rude awakening”:

“It doesn’t matter what we do—whether we speak out or keep quiet... There will always be a pretext to attack Russia. In that situation, it’s better to be open.”

Short argued the West viewed itself as “spotlessly white, clean and pure” while portraying Russia as “some kind of monster that’s just crawled out of the woods, with hooves and horns.” Burns reportedly concluded by 2017 that both nations had long deluded themselves: Russia believed it could be an equal partner despite diminished power, while America assumed it could indefinitely “maneuver over or around Russia.” Short wrote:

“A moment would inevitably come when [Russia] pushed back... A certain amount of friction and a certain number of collisions were built into the equation.”

Short contended it was unsurprising U.S.-Russia relations collapsed, but remarkable the rupture took so long. Putin, he noted, had long resisted hardliners (siloviki) urging confrontation. Conversely, American exceptionalism faced a “Russian exceptionalism no less unyielding.” Most of Putin’s foreign policy moves from 2012–2018, Short concluded, were retaliatory responses to perceived Western “anti-Russian measures.”

=== Cato Institute (2022) ===
Ted Galen Carpenter of the Cato Institute wrote in The National Interest (24 January 2022) that Putin’s speech should have dispelled any doubts about Russia’s perception of NATO expansion as provocative.

“Putin warned his Western counterparts to change course. In hindsight, this may have been the final opportunity to avert a new Cold War.”

Carpenter criticized the U.S. and NATO for dismissing Putin’s grievances as “combative” while privately acknowledging strategic errors. He cited the 2008 NATO Bucharest Summit pledge to admit Ukraine and Georgia, subsequent Western interference in Ukrainian affairs, and military support for Kyiv as key escalations.

=== Sergey Radchenko (2023) ===
British-Russian historian Sergey Radchenko argued that Putin selectively cited documents, such as the 9 February 1990 conversation between Mikhail Gorbachev and James Baker, where Baker stated NATO would not expand “one inch eastward” – a remark limited to the context of German reunification. Radchenko noted that historian Mary Elise Sarotte demonstrated Soviet leaders ultimately acquiesced to NATO enlargement. Putin’s historical narrative, he concluded, was deeply flawed.

=== Jonathan Haslam (2024) ===
In Hubris, the historian Jonathan Haslam argues that Putin’s speech reflected shifting attitudes after the Iraq War and Ukraine’s Orange Revolution. While Putin emphasized his rapport with President George W. Bush, his critique was directed at U.S. unilateralism. Haslam notes the discomfort among members of the audience at Putin’s accusations of broken security assurances and at the vagueness of his proposed alternative to the “unipolar world order”. He also cites then U.S. National Security Advisor Stephen Hadley, who acknowledged that U.S. support for pro-Western movements in Russia’s “near abroad” – notably in Georgia, Ukraine and Tajikistan – had undermined cooperation.

=== Scott Horton (2024) ===
In Provoked, Scott Horton analyses Putin’s speech in the wider context of international politics and the evolution of the West’s relations with Russia from 1989 to 2022. In discussing the speech’s resonance, he cites the testimony of William Joseph Burns, then U.S. ambassador to Russia, and quotes Andrey Kortunov, president of the New Eurasia Foundation. According to Burns, Kortunov observed that Putin had initially pursued an “inclusive” foreign policy at the beginning of his second presidential term, encouraged by the 11 September 2001 terrorist attacks and good relations with leaders such as President George W. Bush and other key NATO allies. However, a series of measures perceived in Moscow as anti-Russian—such as Bush’s withdrawal from the Anti-Ballistic Missile Treaty and continued NATO enlargement—had ultimately “dashed Putin’s hopes”.

== Follow-ups ==
Putin later made other speeches that were called follow-ups to the Munich speech, including:

- The 2013 Valdai speech of Vladimir Putin in Sochi on 19 September 2013
- The Crimean speech of Vladimir Putin to the Federal Assembly of Russia on 18 March 2014
- The 2014 Valdai speech of Vladimir Putin in Sochi on 24 October 2014
- The 2015 UN General Assembly speech of Vladimir Putin in New York on 28 September 2015 ("I'm urged to ask those who created this situation: do you at least realize now what you’ve done?")

== See also ==
- European Security Treaty
- Foreign policy of Vladimir Putin
