= Kremlin.ru =

Website for the President of Russia

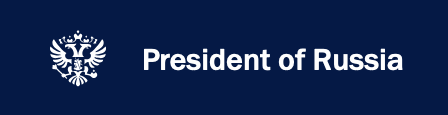

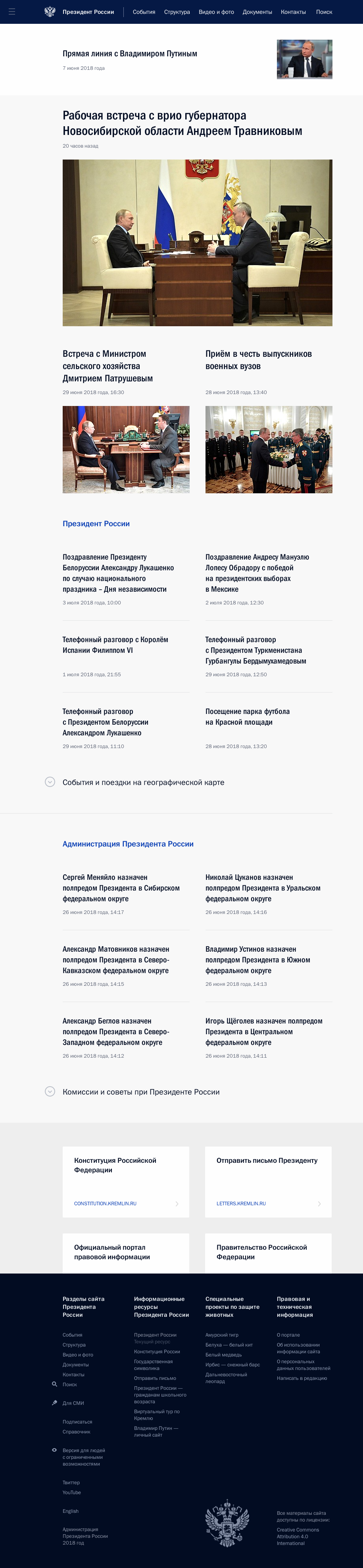
- Screenshot
- Available in: 2 languages
- List of languages English, Russian
- Founded: 1 January 2000
- Headquarters: {{{location_country}}}
- Area served: Worldwide
- Owner: President of the Russian Federation
- Website: en.kremlin.ru
- Registration: none

Kremlin.ru is the official website of the President of the Russian Federation. It was launched in January 2000. Website content is licensed under a Creative Commons Attribution 4.0 International license.

== Content ==
The website publishes all content issued by the Presidential Press Service in Russian and English, including transcripts of President's speeches (e.g., Valdai speech of Vladimir Putin).

== History ==
The kremlin.ru website of was launched in January 2000, and was radically reworked during 2001–2002, which resulted in a second version being released on 20 June 2002, followed by an English version a year later. On 19 January 2004, a children's version was released, called President of Russia – for citizens of school age."

Version 3 was released on 20 June 2004, only three months after the 2004 Russian presidential election.

Version 4 was released on 31 August 2009, with an English version added on 3 June 2010.

The current version 5 was released on 8 April 2015.

On 11 May 2010, the site became one of the first three sites in the domain .рф.

On 20 July 2012, the site was target of a DDoS attack, and in 2013, the site was blocked in Turkmenistan.

On 24 February 2022, the site was intermittently unavailable due to a DDoS attack as a reaction to the Russian invasion of Ukraine.
