= William H. Hill (diplomat) =

American historian and diplomat

William H. Hill is an American historian, diplomat, retired U.S. Army officer, and professor. He taught as Professor of National Security Strategy at the National Defense University in Washington, D.C., and is regarded as an expert on Eastern European security policy, Russia, and the post-Soviet space.

== Education and early career ==
Hill studied at Harvard College, where an undergraduate course taught by Richard Pipes inspired him to specialize in Russian history. He went on to earn his doctorate at the University of California, Berkeley, focusing on Russian intellectual history. His dissertation examined the development of social criticism under Nicholas I through the writings of Vissarion Belinsky. His academic mentors included Nicholas Riasanovsky, Martin Malia, Reginald Zelnik, and Andrew Janos.

During the early 1970s, Hill spent a year at Leningrad State University through the IREX exchange program. While in Leningrad, he worked as an interpreter during President Richard Nixon’s 1972 visit, an experience that inspired him to join the U.S. Foreign Service.

== Diplomatic career ==
Hill joined the U.S. Foreign Service and initially worked on the Soviet Desk in Washington, including during the U.S. response to the Soviet invasion of Afghanistan. He later served at the U.S. embassies in Moscow and Belgrade, where he learned Serbo-Croatian and developed further expertise in Balkan affairs.

From the 1980s onward, Hill worked closely with the Conference on Security and Co-operation in Europe (CSCE), which later became the Organization for Security and Co-operation in Europe (OSCE). In 1999, he was appointed Head of the OSCE Mission to Moldova, a position he held—with breaks—until 2006. He played a key role in mediation efforts in the Transnistria conflict.

== Academic career ==
After leaving government service, Hill taught at Georgetown University before accepting a permanent position at the National Defense University in Washington, D.C. He is a long-time member of the Association for Slavic, East European, and Eurasian Studies (ASEEES) and participates actively in scholarly and policy-oriented debates on European security.

== Research and analysis ==
Hill's research focuses on Russian foreign and security policy, the role of the OSCE in the post-Soviet region, and the institutional evolution of European security since the Cold War. One of his research topics is Moldova.

=== No Place for Russia (2018) ===
In his book, No Place for Russia, William H. Hill examines the deteriorating relations between Russia and Europe since the end of the Cold War, arguing that these tensions stem from decisions made in the 1990s. According to Hugo Klijn, Hill suggests that rather than fostering cooperation, Western policies have led to Russia's exclusion from critical European security institutions. Hill traces the evolution of European security institutions like NATO, the EU, and the OSCE from 1989 through the Ukraine conflict in 2014. He claims the cooperative post-Cold War atmosphere shifted dramatically into one of mistrust and hostility. The title, No Place for Russia, reflects the outcome of Western decisions that inadvertently sidelined Russia from important security dialogues and institutions. Hill argues that both the West and Russia did not anticipate this exclusion—indicating a collective failure in diplomatic foresight. As the most critical decisions, Hill identifies the EU's early stance against Russian membership. The EU opted for a special relationship instead, which became increasingly unbalanced as the union expanded, isolating Russia. NATO, while occasionally discussing Russian membership, ultimately prioritized Central European integration over Russian interests. Hill highlights a series of decisions that reinforced Russia's marginalization within the Euro-Atlantic security framework. By the mid-2000s, Russian leaders began to express concerns about their exclusion from pivotal security discussions. Complaints included not only territorial expansions but also decisions such as the unilateral recognition of Kosovo, which sidelined Russia and further deepened distrust. Hill notes that alongside external relations, internal Russian political developments—particularly a move away from early post-Soviet openness—also played a critical role in halting constructive dialogue. The lack of recognition for former Soviet republics as fully independent states fostered resentment and conflict. Although the OSCE had the potential to serve as a multilateral forum for addressing security concerns, its role has diminished due to the dominance of NATO and the EU in shaping security policies. Klijn underlines Hill's criticism of the failure to fully utilize the OSCE's capabilities, particularly during crisis situations. For the future, Hill posits that to rebuild relationships, new frameworks governing international relations, especially concerning nuclear weapons and emerging technologies, must be established. He emphasizes the importance of engaging Russia as a significant player in this process, despite differences.

In his review, Liviu Horowitz underlines Hill's call for establishing a new set of rules to guide future relations with Russia to avoid a law-of-the-jungle scenario, stressing the importance of inclusive dialogue.

== Personal life ==
Hill is also a musician and sports enthusiast. He played bluegrass and country music in bands during his postings in Moscow, Leningrad, Belgrade, Zagreb, and Dhaka. He enjoys tennis, hockey, and baseball, and remains an avid reader of Russian literature—particularly the detective novels by Boris Akunin.

== Quotation ==
The Russians started to complain that the US did not bring the most important security questions to the OSCE. And they were right. If we discussed them with the Russians we did it bilaterally or in the NATO-Russia Council. It is a problem that reinforces itself because then the Russians don’t bring the important questions to the OSCE, either. They say it’s meaningless, we’ll just denounce you there, but then we’ll go talk with you bilaterally where we’ll have the real talks. So the OSCE rarely became the forum where you could have a debate. (...) Unfortunately the one, the big failure was that we ended up with Russia left out and finding that it had no place. And this, given how important Russia is, even before you look at its own considerable self-estimation, is just something that wasn’t tenable.

== Selected publications ==
- Russia, the Near Abroad, and the West: Lessons from the Moldova-Transdniestria Conflict. Woodrow Wilson Center Press, 2012. ISBN 9781421405650
- No Place for Russia: European Security Institutions Since 1989. Columbia University Press, 2018. ISBN 978-0-231-18203-4
