= 2014 Valdai speech of Vladimir Putin =

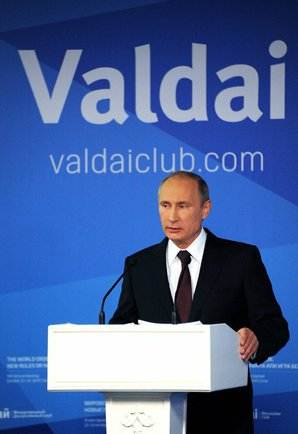
Putin talks to Valdai International Discussion Club, Sochi city, 24 October 2014

The Valdai speech of Vladimir Putin is a press-coined name for the speech that the Russian President Vladimir Putin delivered at the Valdai International Discussion Club XI session on 24 October 2014, in Sochi.

Back on 20 February 2014, Russia began an annexation of Crimea using Russian troops disguised as local militia. Then in March, immediately following the Euromaidan protest movement, Putin began support (again disguised) for pro-Russian, anti-government separatist groups in the Donbas region. Under the guise of protecting oppressed peoples, he was essentially at war against the Ukrainian government, hence his fascism reference below.

The overall meeting's theme was "The World Order: New Rules or a Game without Rules?"

The initial 40-minute speech was followed by a lengthy press-conference, where Putin answered questions, and made additional remarks that attracted heavy media attention.

== Excerpts ==
The Kremlin.ru Presidential Press service website published the transcript of Putin's words, and emphasized the following quotations:

- "The world is full of contradictions today. We need to be frank in asking each other if we have a reliable safety net in place. Sadly, there is no guarantee and no certainty that the current system of global and regional security is able to protect us from upheavals. The international and regional political, economic, and cultural cooperation organisations are also going through difficult times."
- "The Cold War ended, but it did not end with the signing of a peace treaty with clear and transparent agreements on respecting existing rules or creating new rules and standards. This created the impression that the so-called ‘victors’ in the Cold War had decided to pressure events and reshape the world to suit their own needs and interests."
- "In a situation where you had domination by one country and its allies, or its satellites rather, the search for global solutions often turned into an attempt to impose their own universal recipes. This group’s ambitions grew so big that they started presenting the policies they put together in their corridors of power as the view of the entire international community. But this is not the case."
- "A unilateral diktat and imposing one’s own models produces the opposite result. Instead of settling conflicts it leads to their escalation, instead of sovereign and stable states we see the growing spread of chaos, and instead of democracy there is support for a very dubious public ranging from open neo-fascists to Islamic radicals."
- "Today, we are seeing new efforts to fragment the world, draw new dividing lines, put together coalitions not built for something but directed against someone, anyone, create the image of an enemy as was the case during the Cold War years, and obtain the right to this leadership, or diktat if you wish."
- "Sanctions are already undermining the foundations of world trade, the WTO rules and the principle of inviolability of private property. They are dealing a blow to liberal model of globalisation based on markets, freedom and competition, which is a model that has primarily benefited precisely the Western countries."
- "You cannot mix politics and the economy, but this is what is happening now. I have always thought and still think today that politically motivated sanctions were a mistake that will harm everyone."
- "Russia is a self-sufficient country. We will work within the foreign economic environment that has taken shape, develop domestic production and technology and act more decisively to carry out transformation. Pressure from outside, as has been the case on past occasions, will only consolidate our society."
- "We have no intention of shutting ourselves off from anyone and choosing some kind of closed development road. We are always open to dialogue, including on normalising our economic and political relations. We are counting here on the pragmatic approach and position of business communities in the leading countries."
- "Russia is supposedly turning its back on Europe – such words were probably spoken already here too during the discussions – and is looking for new business partners, above all in Asia. Let me say that this is absolutely not the case. Our active policy in the Asian-Pacific region began not just yesterday and not in response to sanctions, but is a policy that we have been following for a good many years now. Like many other countries, including Western countries, we saw that Asia is playing an ever greater role in the world, in the economy."
- "There is no doubt that humanitarian factors such as education, science, healthcare and culture are playing a greater role in global competition. This also has a big impact on international relations, including because this ‘soft power’ resource will depend to a great extent on real achievements in developing human capital rather than on sophisticated propaganda tricks."
- "We are sliding into the times when, instead of the balance of interests and mutual guarantees, it is fear and the balance of mutual destruction that prevent nations from engaging in direct conflict."
- "In absence of legal and political instruments, arms are once again becoming the focal point of the global agenda; they are used wherever and however, without any UN Security Council sanctions. And if the Security Council refuses to produce such decisions, then it is immediately declared to be an outdated and ineffective instrument."
- "It is obvious that success and real results are only possible if key participants in international affairs can agree on harmonising basic interests, on reasonable self-restraint, and set the example of positive and responsible leadership."
- "International relations must be based on international law, which itself should rest on moral principles such as justice, equality and truth. Perhaps most important is respect for one’s partners and their interests. This is an obvious formula, but simply following it could radically change the global situation."
- "The work of integrated associations, the cooperation of regional structures, should be built on a transparent, clear basis; the Eurasian Economic Union’s formation process is a good example of such transparency."
- "Russia made its choice. Our priorities are further improving our democratic and open economy institutions, accelerated internal development, taking into account all the positive modern trends in the world, and consolidating society based on traditional values and patriotism."
- "Russia does not need any kind of special, exclusive place in the world. While respecting the interests of others, we simply want for our own interests to be taken into account and for our position to be respected."
- "Building a more stable world order is a difficult task. We were able to develop rules for interaction after World War II, and we were able to reach an agreement in Helsinki in the 1970s. Our common duty is to resolve this fundamental challenge at this new stage of development."

== Evaluations ==
The Financial Times called the speech "one of most important foreign policy statements". Reuters wrote that, "Putin accuses United States of damaging world order".

== See also ==
- Munich speech of Vladimir Putin
- Crimean speech of Vladimir Putin
