= 2022 annexation speech of Vladimir Putin =

Putin's speech about annexing four Ukrainian regions

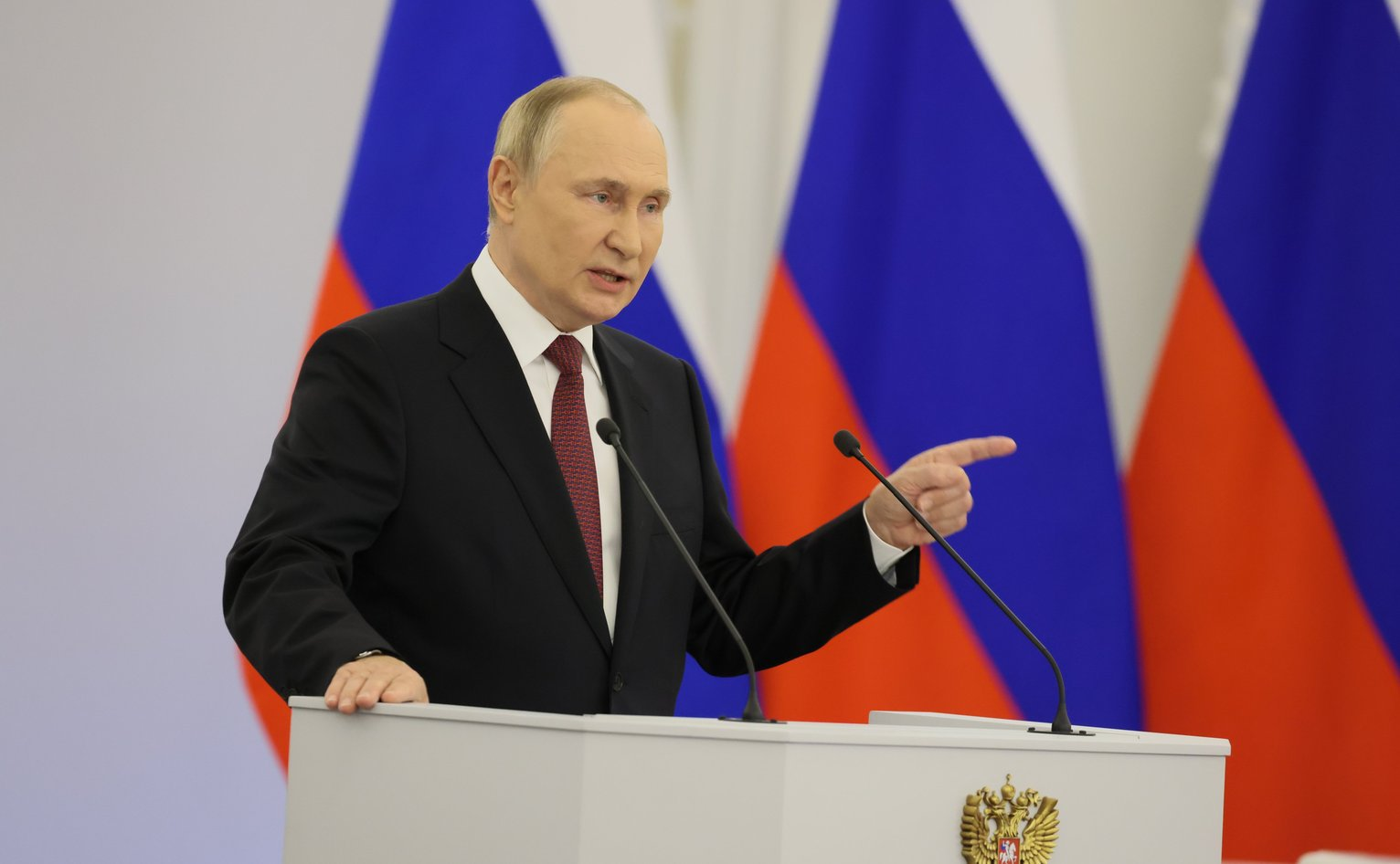
Vladimir Putin during the speech

Putin's annexation speech refers to a 30 September 2022 speech delivered by Russian president Vladimir Putin to both chambers of the Russian parliament concerning the annexation of Ukraine's Donetsk, Kherson, Luhansk and Zaporizhzhia oblasts as federal subjects of Russia. Russia has partially occupied the oblasts since the outbreak of the Russo-Ukrainian War. Putin spoke in the St. George Hall of the Grand Kremlin Palace in the Moscow Kremlin. The tone of the speech was strongly anti-American and anti-Western, to the point where observers described it as his most anti-Western speech to date.

== Background ==
Russian control of Ukraine before referendum of September 2022

The first major annexation of the Ukrainian territory by Russia happened in 2014, namely the annexation of Crimea.

During 23–27 September 2022, after substantial progress of the Russian invasion of Ukraine, Russian proxies in the occupied areas of Ukraine staged referendums on the incorporation of the newly occupied territories into Russia. These referendums were condemned as shams by independent observers and the international community

The actual annexation and the corresponding speech by Putin almost immediately followed the referendum.

== Address ==
Putin said that the September 2022 referendums expressed the "will of millions of people" in these territories to become part of Russia and to become Russian citizens "forever". He cited Article 1 of the UN charter as justification for his claims. In this context, he bashed the Belavezha Accords that dissolved the Soviet Union without asking the oponion of the Soviet people.

Within the speech, Putin spoke about the colonial past of the Western world, denouncing its "totalitarianism, despotism and apartheid", and accused it of attempting to create a neo-colonial and unipolar world order. He said that the West intended to destroy Russia as a nation, and called "the ruling circles of the so-called West" "the enemy" threatening religion and morality, accusing the West of Satanism.

In a digression, Putin spoke strongly about the LGBT and gender politics in the West and claimed that this is unacceptable for Russia.

Putin blamed the 2022 Nord Stream pipelines sabotage on the "Anglo-Saxons" and said that the use of nuclear weapons by the US on Hiroshima and Nagasaki "set a precedent".

== Reactions and commentary ==
The European Council issued a special statement in response to Putin even before his speech ended: "We firmly reject and unequivocally condemn Russia's illegal annexation of the Ukrainian regions".

Shaun Walker described Putin's address as "an angry, rambling speech", which only briefly addressed the annexation event itself, and instead "railed at the west for a litany of sins".

Addressing Putin's call to cease hostilities and "return to the negotiating table", Volodymyr Zelenskyy responded that Ukraine is ready for talks, "but only with another President of Russia" and issued a decree that officially declared the impossibility of negotiations with Putin. The same day he also announced that Ukraine had submitted an application for accelerated membership in NATO and said that the Russian annexation was an attempt to "steal what does not belong to it, rewrite history, and redraw borders."

Björn Alexander Düben, professor of international affairs, writes that Putin's announcement of the annexation hardly "represents the full extent of Putin’s territorial ambitions".

Peter Dickinson of Atlantic Council notes that "Putin is apparently oblivious to the absurdity of condemning imperialism while at the same time committing the most brazen act of imperial aggression in modern European history". He also expressed an opinion that Putin's emphasis on anti-imperialism reflects the change in Russian foreign politics: recognizing the low chance of restoring relations with the West, Putin seeks to take an advantage of the global anti-Western sentiment, specifically speaking about "essentially emancipatory, anti-colonial movement against unipolar hegemony".

== See also ==
- List of speeches given by Vladimir Putin
