= European Security Treaty =

Proposed security treaty

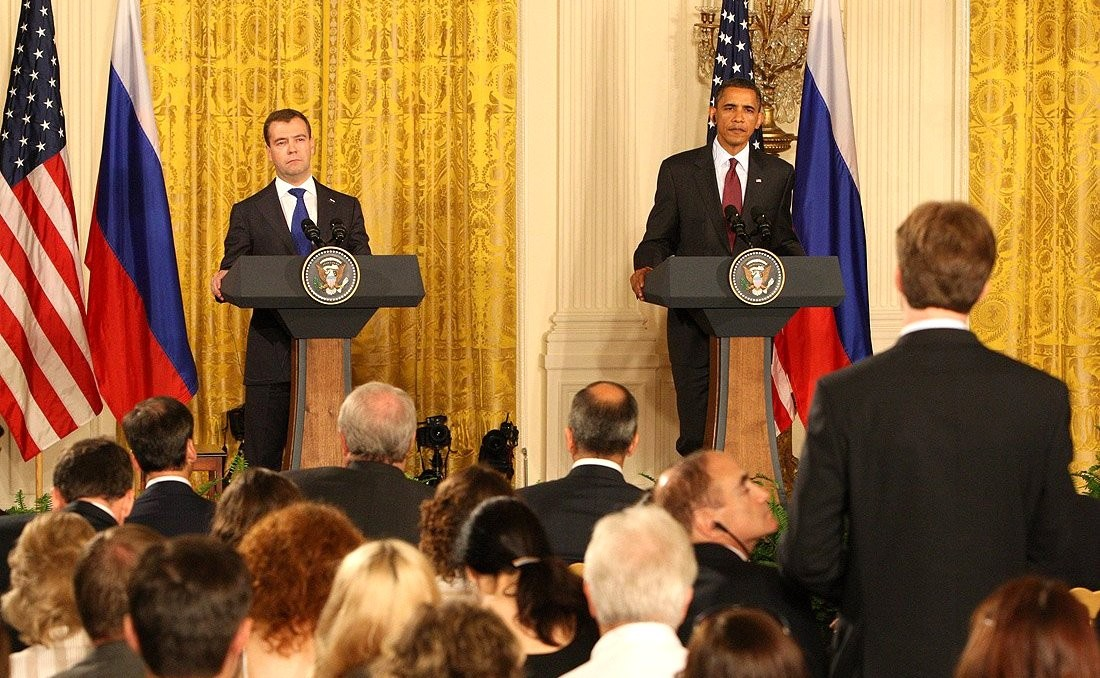
Dmitry Medvedev with Barack Obama at a joint press conference in Washington, 2010

The European Security Treaty was a proposition made by Russian president Dmitry Medvedev for a new security agreement between Europe, CIS countries, and the United States. The treaty was a push from Russia to address the "NATO-centrism" in the European security architecture.

== History ==
The European Security Treaty was announced in Berlin on 5 June 2008. It was then debated during a working lunch between foreign ministers of the OSCE participating States at the Ministerial Council in Helsinki in December 2008. An informal meeting to further the discussions was organized on the island of Corfu, which led to the creation of the Corfu process that was adopted by the permanent council of the OSCE.

During a press conference in New York in September 2008, Lavrov enunciated some of the issues this treaty would address:

- USA's plans to station components of missile defence systems in Poland and the Czech Republic;
- NATO's eastward enlargement;
- USA's plans to establish new bases in Romania and Bulgaria;
- USA's lack of readiness to seriously talk about nuclear arms control with Russia.

While the content of the treaty is barely known, when Medvedev introduced it, he talked about "old line of bloc politics", declared that Atlanticism was obsolete, and that a new deal needs to include non-NATO countries (including Russia) in Europe's security policies. At the World Policy Conference in Evian, France, on 8 October 2008, Medvedev said "a new European security order should not exclude (or isolate) any state in the Euro-Atlantic area". In Evian, he highlighted a little further the goals of the treaty, which are to:

1. Align security policies with international laws;
2. An egalitarian application of the treaty;
3. A notion of equality in security measures;
4. No ruling country above others;
5. Define the parameters of military actions (including arms control).

In Evian, the treaty found the support of French President Nicolas Sarkozy.

A revised version of the proposed treaty was presented during the OSCE's Annual Security Review Conference in Vienna on 23 June 2009. The new draft contained essentially minor revisions. Lavrov announced on 1 October 2009 that "Russia would present a formal treaty proposal in the foreseeable future". In the end, the aim of the treaty is merely to extend the UN Charter and OSCE documents to set a uniform interpretation system in those existing principles.

== See also ==
- Controversy regarding NATO's eastward expansion
- Treaty on Conventional Armed Forces in Europe
- European integration

== Literature ==
- Richard Weitz: The Rise and Fall of Medvedev's European Security Treaty, German Marshall Fund 2012.
- Ulrich Kühn: Medvedev's Proposals for a New European Security Order: A Starting Point or the End of the Story?, in: Connections, vol. 9, no. 2 (Spring 2010), pp. 1–16.
