= Presidential lecterns of the United States =

Lectern used by the President of the United States

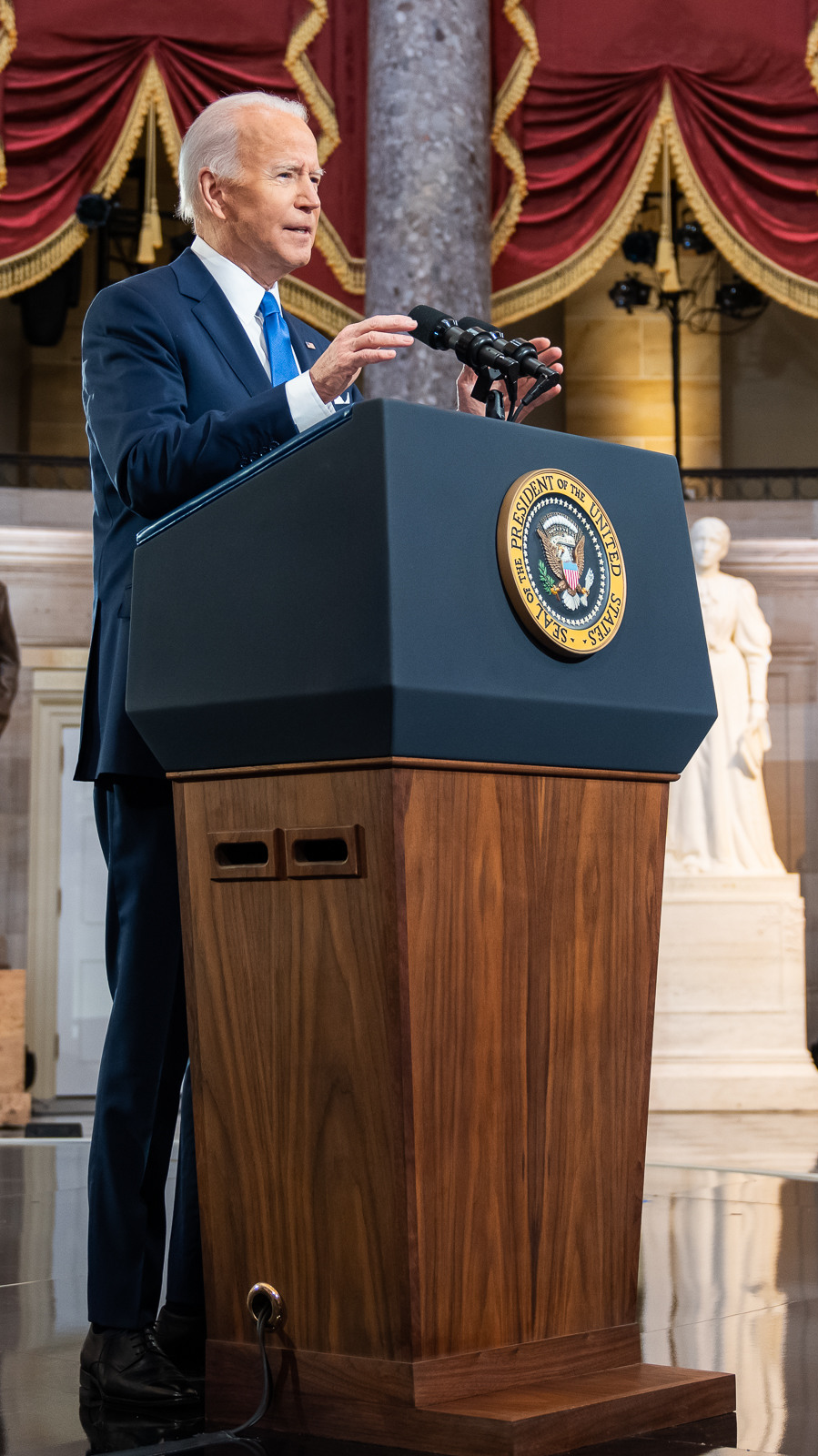
The Blue Goose lectern

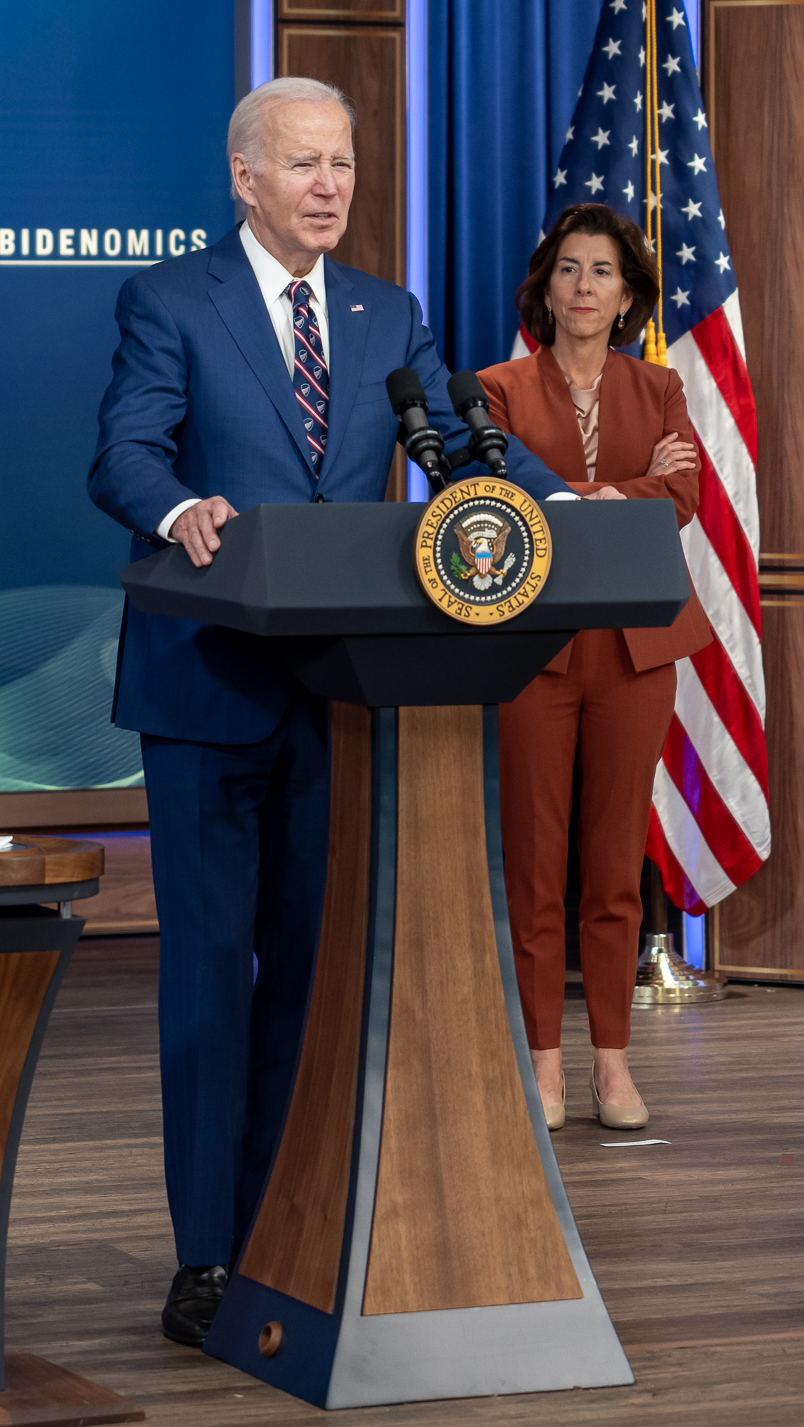
The Falcon lectern

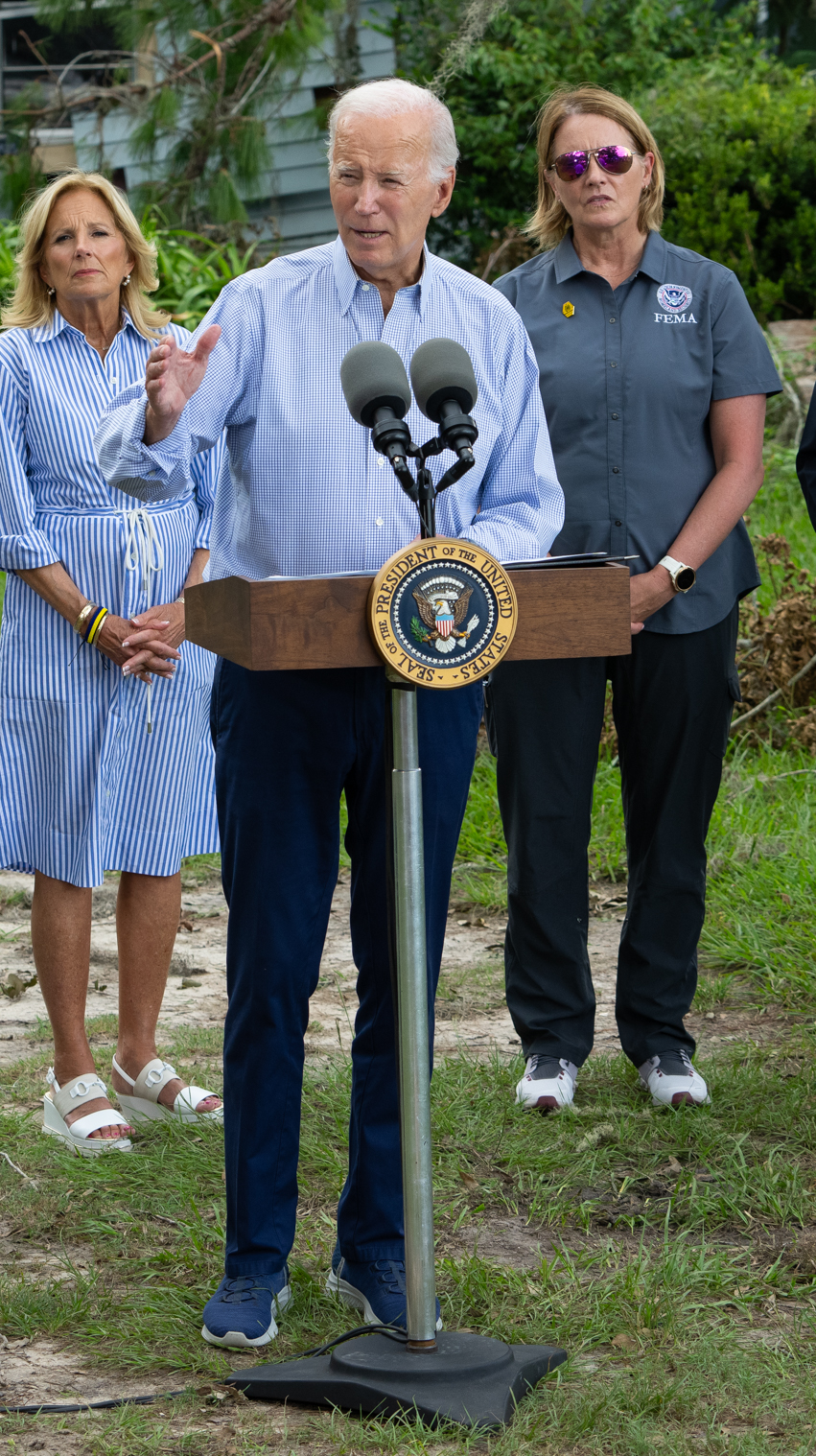
The Toast lectern

Three types of lectern are used by the president of the United States. The Blue Goose is the main bullet-resistant lectern, used mostly at the White House and for domestic speeches. Its downsized counterpart, the Falcon, is used for travel purposes, and the Toast lectern is the smallest version, used for informal events. The White House Communications Agency (WHCA) presides over many Blue Goose and Falcon lecterns, building them and sending teams to set up the lecterns at all events where the president, vice president, or first lady speak. All three types are usually adorned with the seal of the president of the United States when they are in attendance.

== Designs ==
=== Blue Goose ===
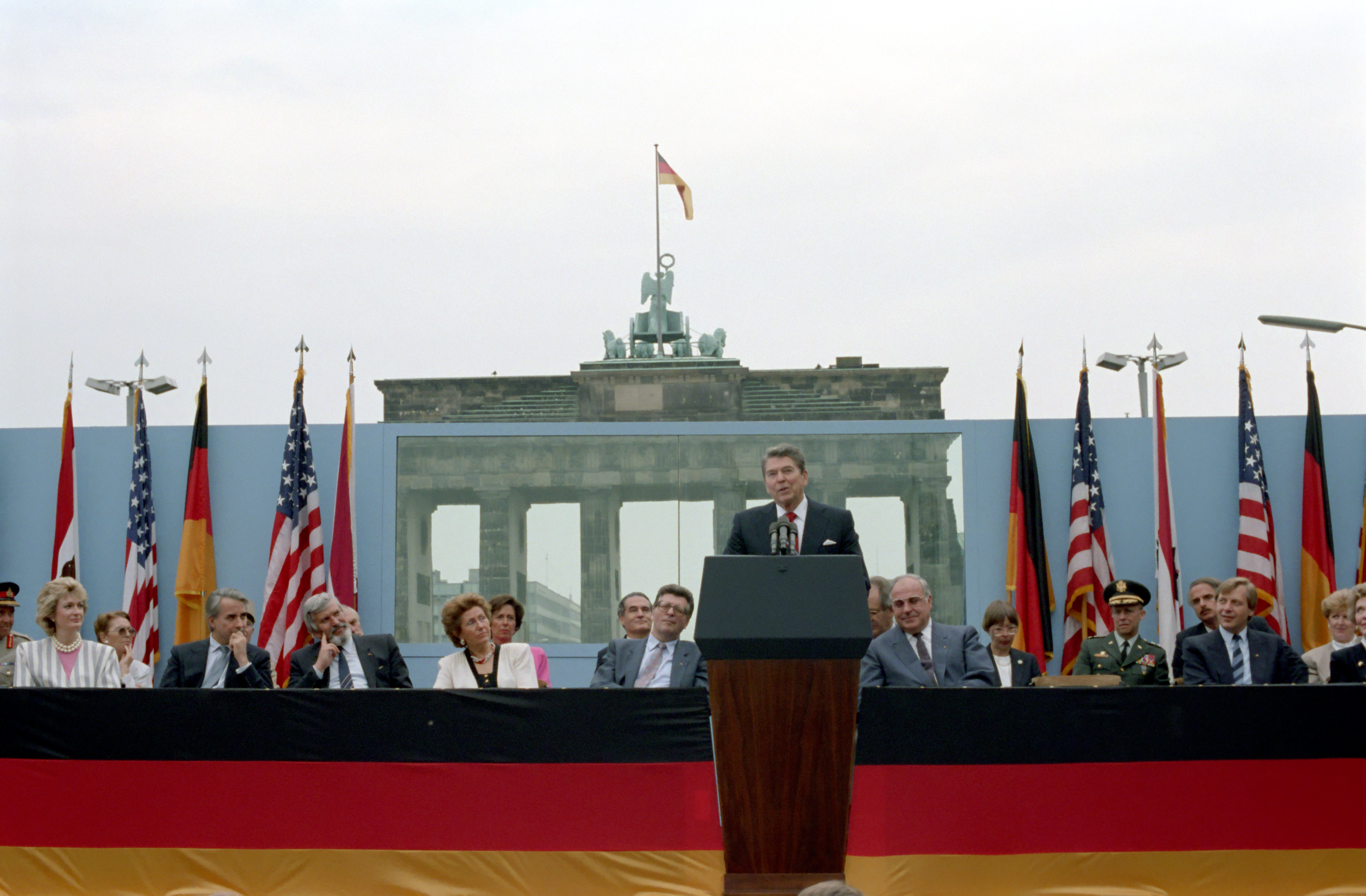
In 1987, President Ronald Reagan used a Blue Goose lectern to give the "Tear down this wall!" speech in West Berlin

Described by Politico as "bulky" and "formal", and named by the United States Secret Service after the color of its top and its gooseneck microphone, the bullet-resistant or bullet-proof Blue Goose lecterns are boxy, with a dark blue desk section and dark panels on their wide bases. They reportedly weigh several hundred pounds and are often transported in an aluminum crate, in the military cargo plane that transports the limousines and other presidential items. The lecterns often feature glass-paned teleprompters placed on their corners, with space for paper copies of a script in case of errors, as well as space for a glass of water. Dual Shure SM57 microphones have been used for most of the lecterns' appearances, with the occasional use of condenser microphones under the Clinton and Trump presidencies. The sides on the top of the lectern feature foam pads that are covered in blue leather for more comfortable leaning. A small stool can be pulled out from beneath the lecterns to account for the differing heights of multiple speakers; In 2010, former Chief of Protocol of the United States Mary Mel French wrote that checking and adjusting the height of the lecterns is part of event protocol at the White House.

=== Falcon ===
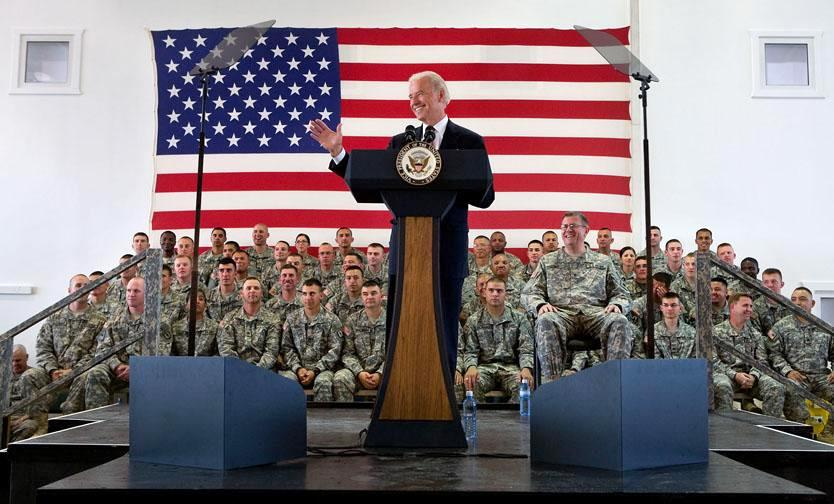
Then-Vice President Joe Biden used a Falcon lectern in Kosovo, 2009

Custom-built by the WHCA under the presidency of George W. Bush, the Falcon lectern has a sleeker, hourglass-like shape with a plinth wider at the base and trimmer at the top. The lectern also sits lower than the Blue Goose, and is adjustable. It was designed so that more of the background would be visible on television, particularly in close-up shots. It was dubbed the 'Falcon' by workmen and Bush aides, largely due to its shape. Bush's Communications assistant Scott Sforza stated in 2002 that the introduction of the lectern "made for a much, much better event", and that "we have had great results with it, even in events where we have message banners. You can see the banners much better, because [the lectern] sits lower, and it really plays well with that backdrop, so it doesn't dominate the show."

A lectern with a similar design to the Falcon is used in the Ohio Clock corridor in the United States Senate.

=== Toast ===
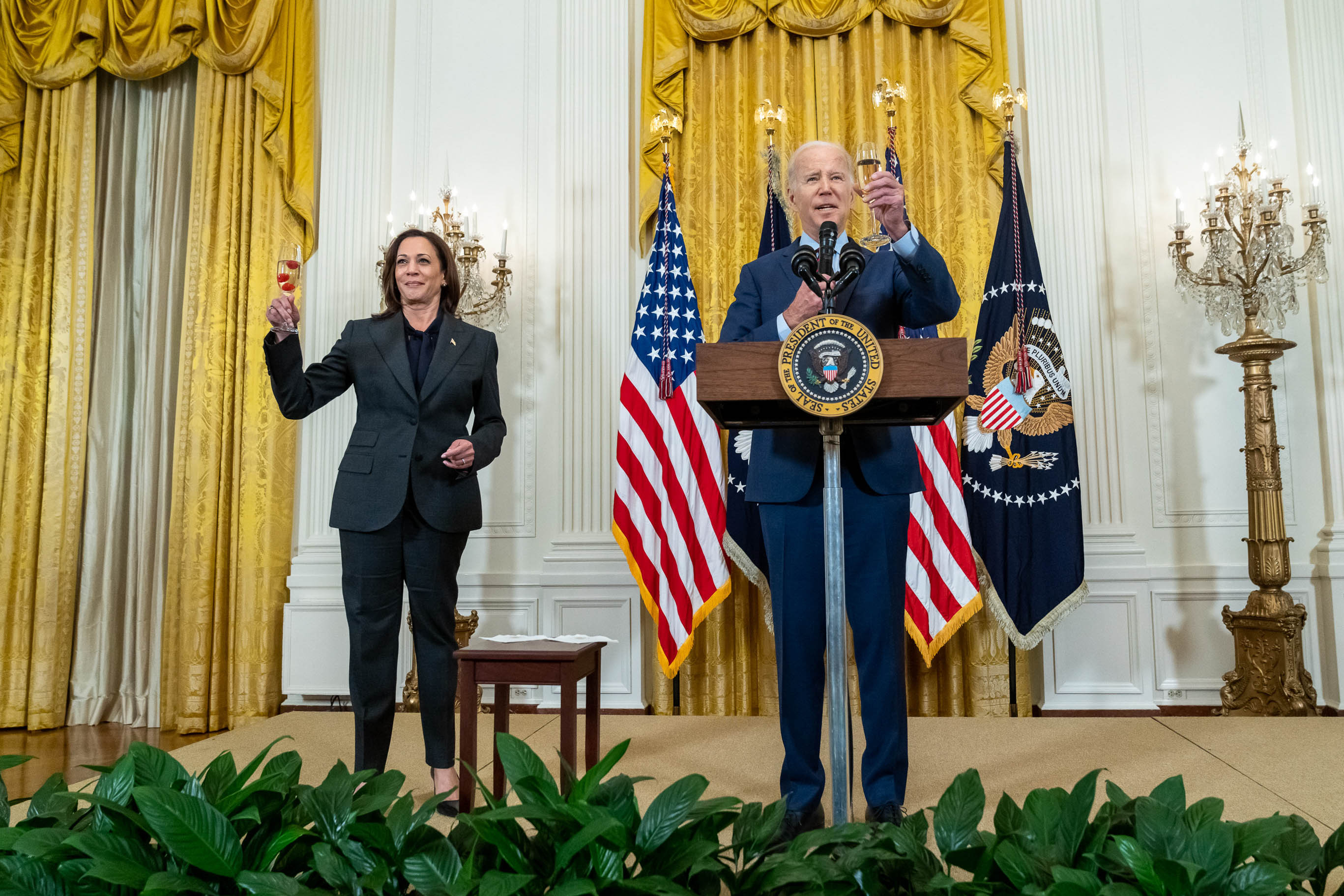
Presidents often use the Toast lectern to raise toasts

The Toast lectern, a small wooden platform atop a metal pole, is the smallest lectern frequently used by the president, sometimes for toasts at events such as state dinners.

== History ==
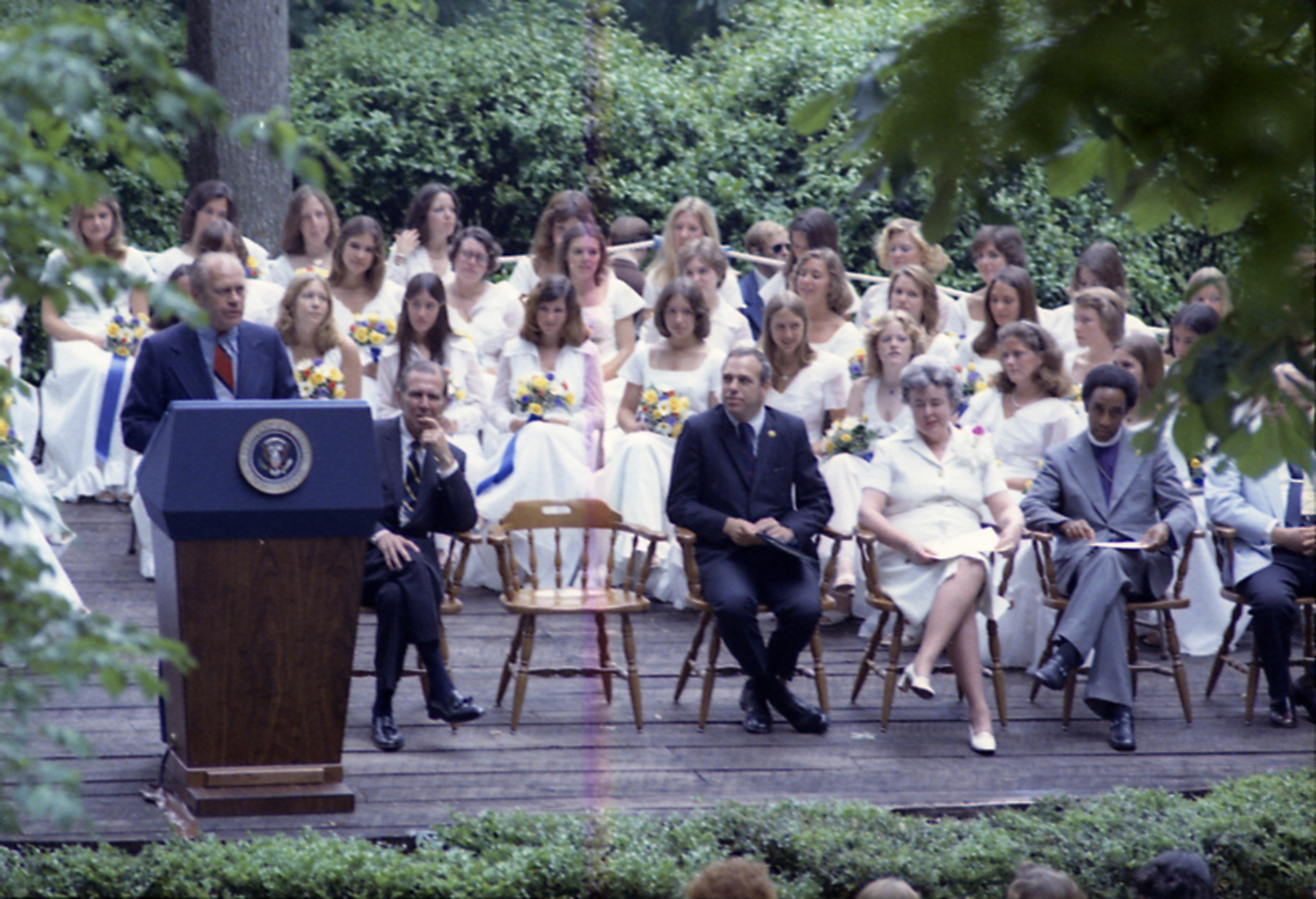
Gerald Ford used a Blue Goose lectern in 1975

Jimmy Carter used the Blue Goose lectern, without the presidential seal, during his May 1977 visit to the United Kingdom. Carter also used a lectern with a presidential seal during town hall meetings. Academics have argued that the lectern accentuated his position as a singular presidential figure and contradicted expectations that the meetings would be informal and authentic, resembling more of a "press conference".

On May 16, 1991, Queen Elizabeth II made remarks from the Blue Goose at a White House welcoming ceremony alongside President George H. W. Bush. Due to the fixed height of the lectern at the time, only her hat was visible to television audiences; she quipped the next day while addressing a joint session of Congress that “I do hope you can see me today from where you are.”

On January 26, 1998, for Bill Clinton's press conference addressing the Clinton–Lewinsky scandal, a modified version of the Blue Goose was used, replacing the Shure SM57 microphones normally used for the lecterns with a 16-inch condenser microphone. The sensitive microphone picked up Clinton's repeated raps against the lectern when he stated "I did not have sexual relations with that woman." In June that year, a Blue Goose lectern was taken with Clinton on his visit to China. A condenser microphone was not used with the Blue Goose again until the presidency of Donald Trump.

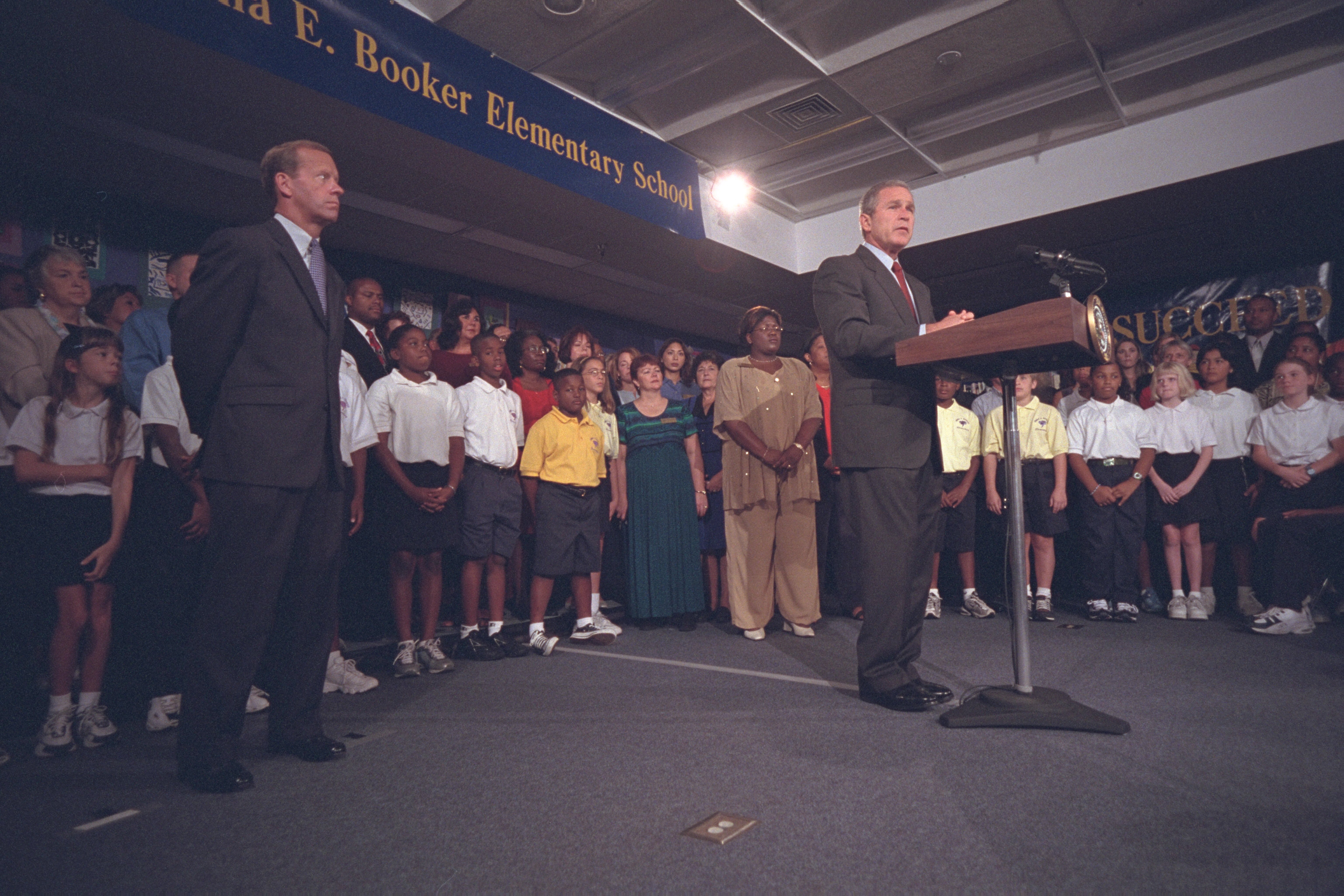
George W. Bush used a Toast lectern to deliver remarks on the September 11 attacks in 2001

During the presidency of George W. Bush, the sleeker Falcon lectern was created and came into use during a visit by Vladimir Putin to the United States in November 2001. Journalists noted that Bush used the Blue Goose more sparingly than Carter had done, usually only in the Rose Garden or East Room of the White House, with the intent of reserving presidential symbols for major events.

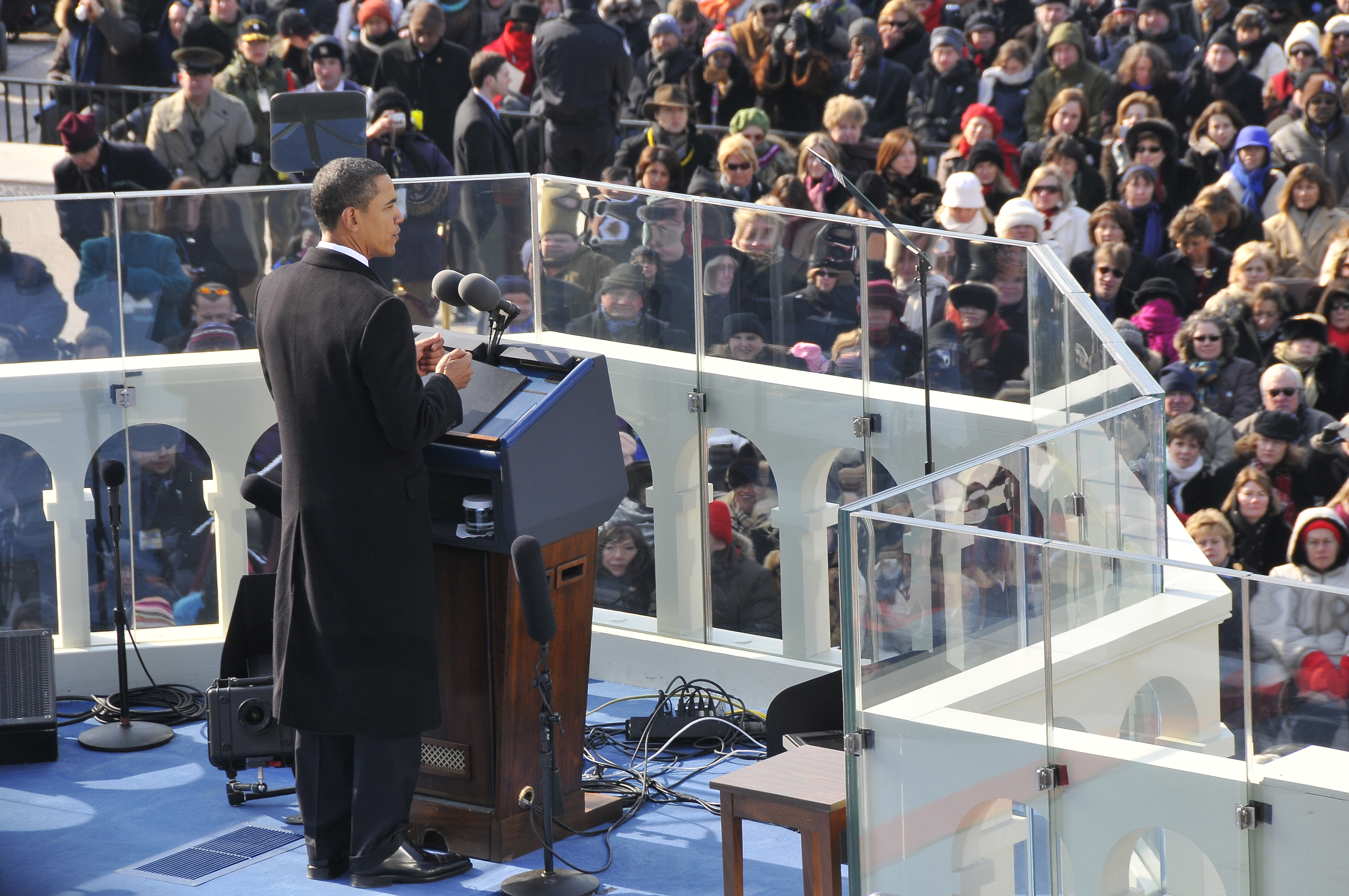
Barack Obama used the Blue Goose for his inaugural address in 2009

French President Nicolas Sarkozy, who was 5 ft 5 in (1.65 m) and often mocked for his height, used a footstool to speak at the Blue Goose in Normandy in 2009. At a Fortune's Most Powerful Women summit in 2010, the presidential seal fell off the Blue Goose in the middle of a speech by Barack Obama, who joked that "that's all right, all of you know who I am," and that the staff who had set up the lectern would be "sweating bullets". In 2011, a Defense Information Systems Agency truck containing presidential seals and lecterns was stolen in suburban Virginia. Near the end of the 2012 United States presidential election race, the United States Secret Service directed Obama to stand behind the Blue Goose during speeches for his safety. His communications director Brent Coburn later said that Obama's advisers "were fighting to not use the blue goose," and that "we lost that fight. You usually lose fights with the Secret Service."

The inauguration of Donald Trump in 2017 brought the return of a single dynamic (Shure SM57) microphone mounted on a black gooseneck extension 19 inches long, to reduce the distance between the microphone and his mouth. On May 26, 2017, Sean Spicer and Gary Cohn commented on one of the lecterns in a hotel room while at the NATO Brussels summit, stating "this is ours," and "we own it," in reference to their prominence on the world stage. Trump also used the Falcon when refuting the Mueller special counsel investigation in 2019, with Trump aides affixing a placard to the lectern that read "Mueller investigation by the numbers," and the catchphrase "no collusion. No obstruction."

In 2022, it was noted that Joe Biden was often eschewing the Blue Goose, instead using a handheld microphone.

== Unofficial replicas ==
Members of Congress sometimes purchase their own versions of the lecterns for use in their districts. In 2015, BuzzFeed News reported that Aaron Schock was using an unofficial replica of the Falcon lectern, for which he had spent about $5,000 using a taxpayer-funded account, when speaking in Peoria, Illinois.

In June 2023, the office of Sarah Huckabee Sanders, Governor of Arkansas, purchased a custom 39-inch replica of the Falcon lectern with an accompanying road case from Beckett Events LLC for $19,029.25, using a state-issued credit card. The amount was reimbursed by the Republican Party on September 14. That month, public record requests revealed the purchase to the public, drawing criticism of the purchase as alleged waste or potential wrongdoing. An anonymous whistleblower also claimed that Sanders’ office improperly altered and withheld public records related to spending on the lectern. Some critics nicknamed the controversy "#LecternGate" or "#PodiumGate", and Sanders stated that it was a "manufactured controversy". The Arkansas General Assembly launched an audit of the purchase on 12 October 2023, which was released on 15 April 2024. The audit stated that Sanders' office potentially violated laws, including illegally tampering with public records and shredding a bill of lading associated with the lectern. In response, Sanders posted a video montage of the lectern on Twitter, with the words "come and take it". An investigation determined that no criminal charges were warranted.

== Gallery ==
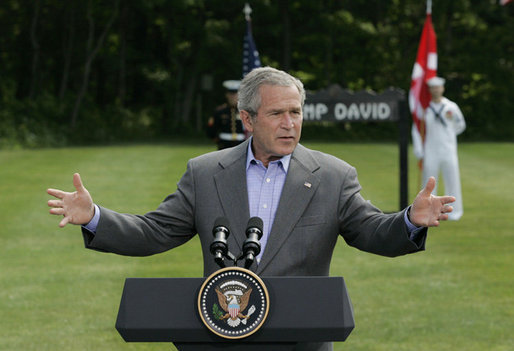
The Falcon lectern featuring the coat of arms of the president of the United States in 2006

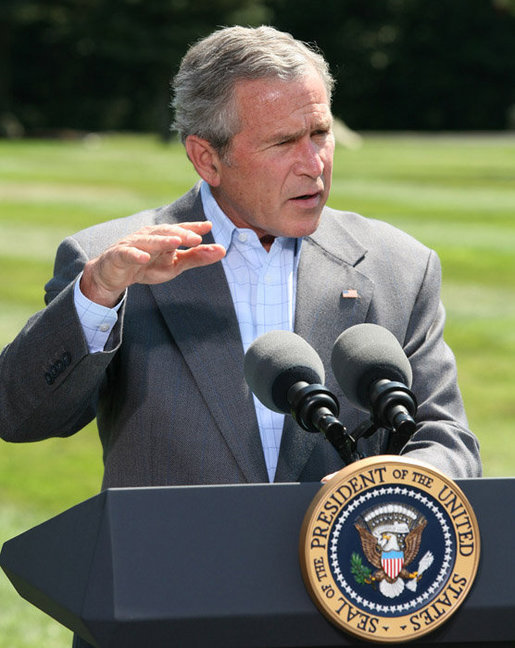
The Falcon lectern featuring the seal of the president of the United States in 2006

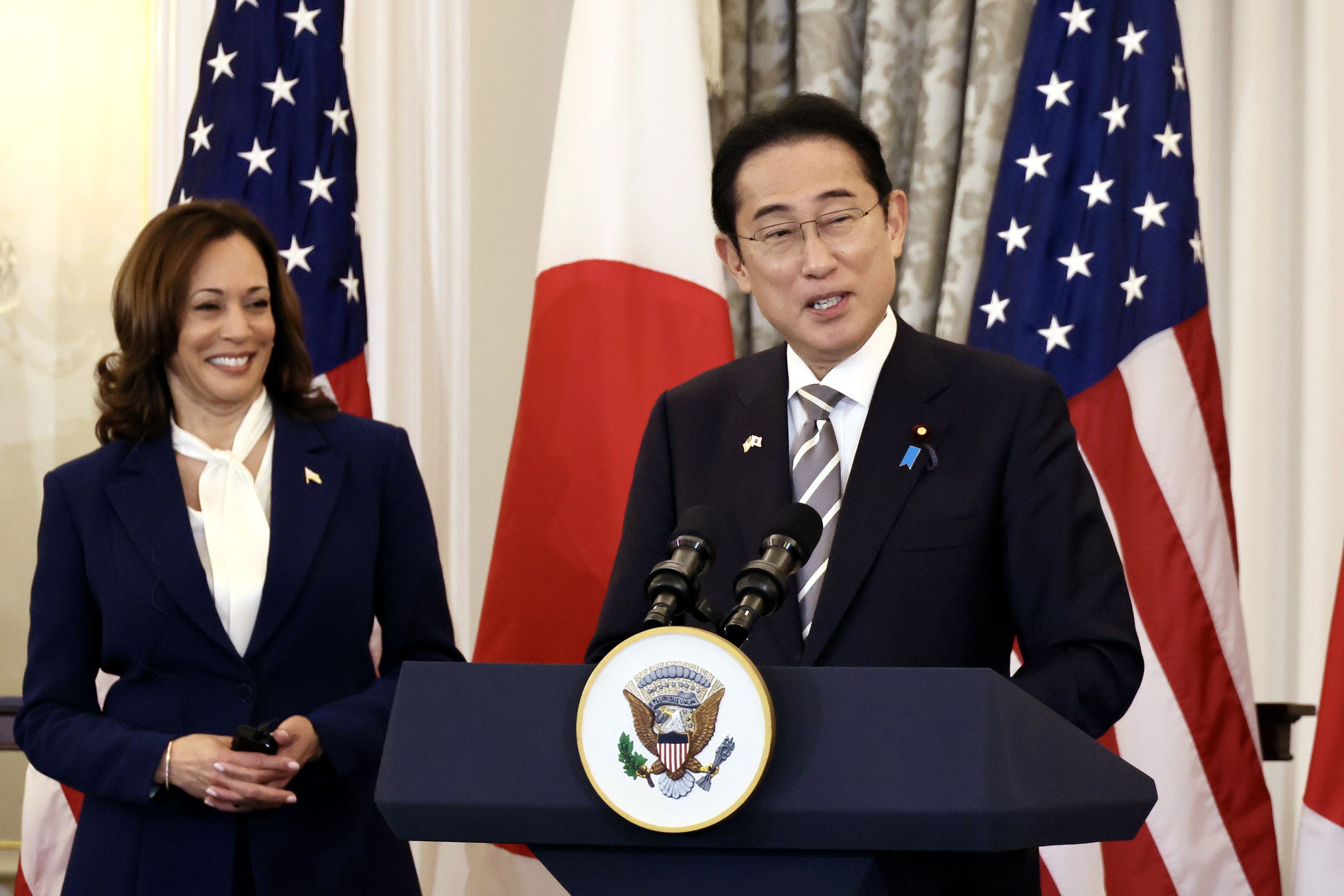
The Falcon lectern featuring the coat of arms of the vice president of the United States in 2024

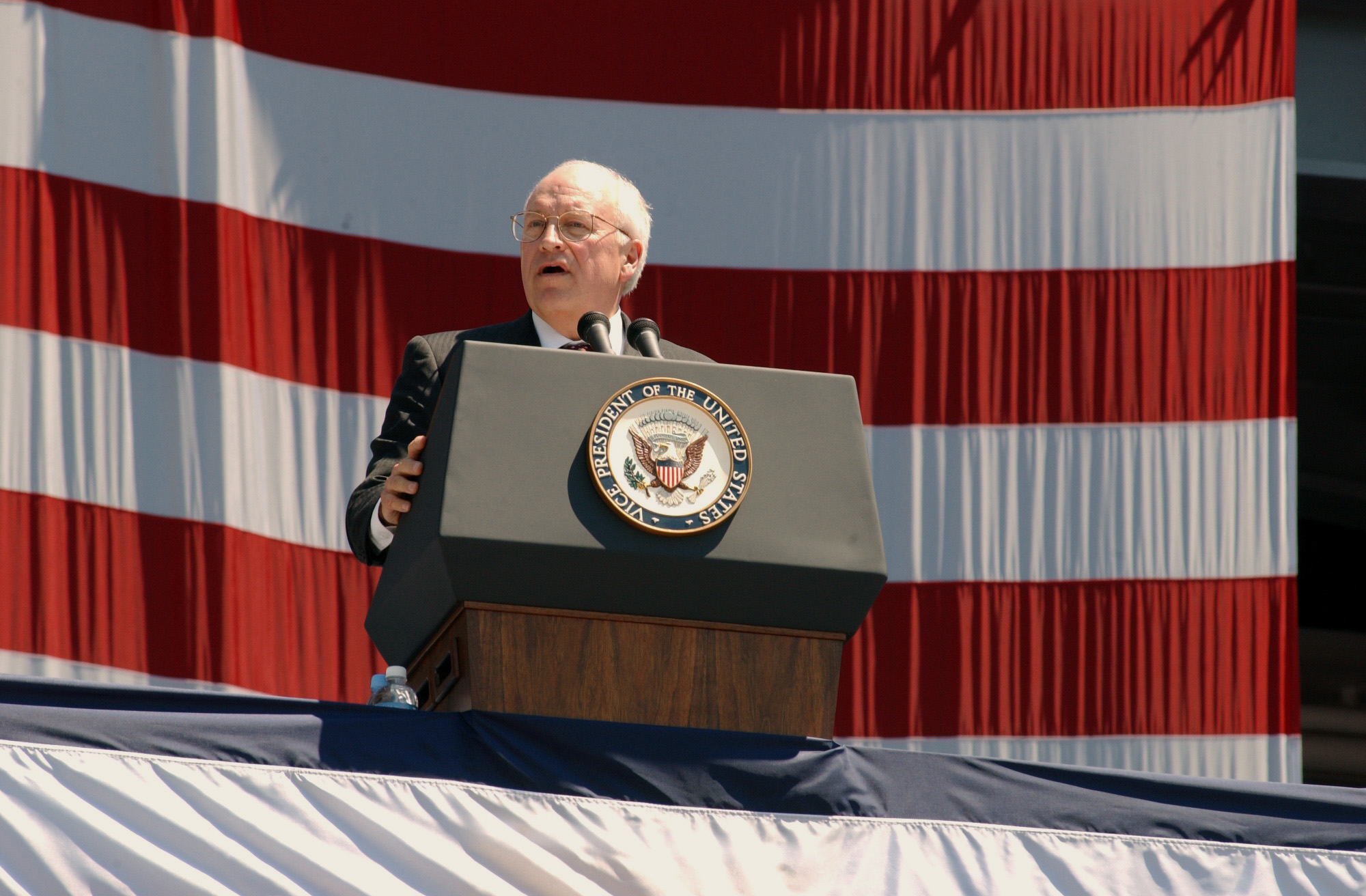
The Blue Goose lectern featuring the seal of the vice president of the United States in 2003

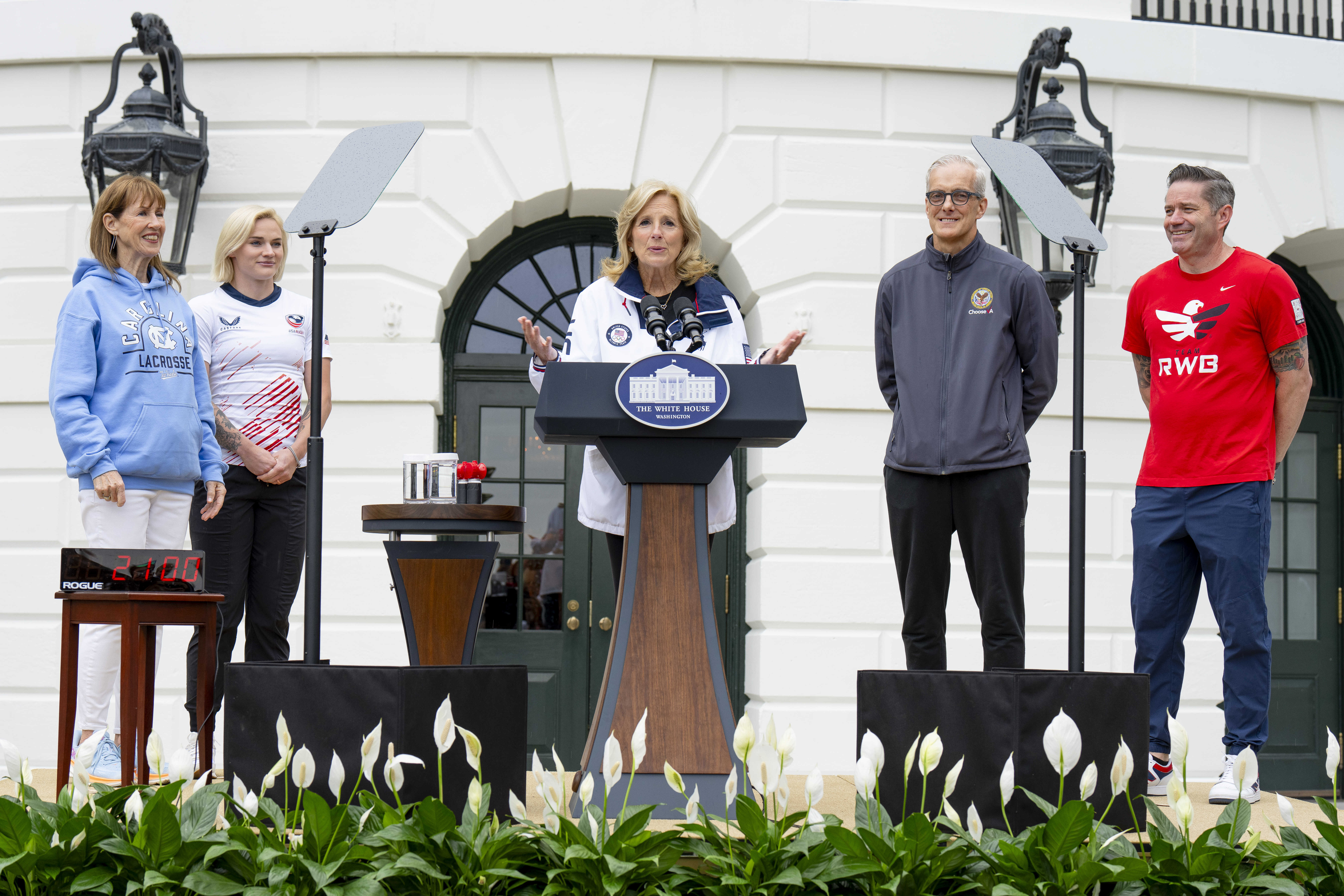
The Falcon lectern featuring the logo of the United States White House in 2024

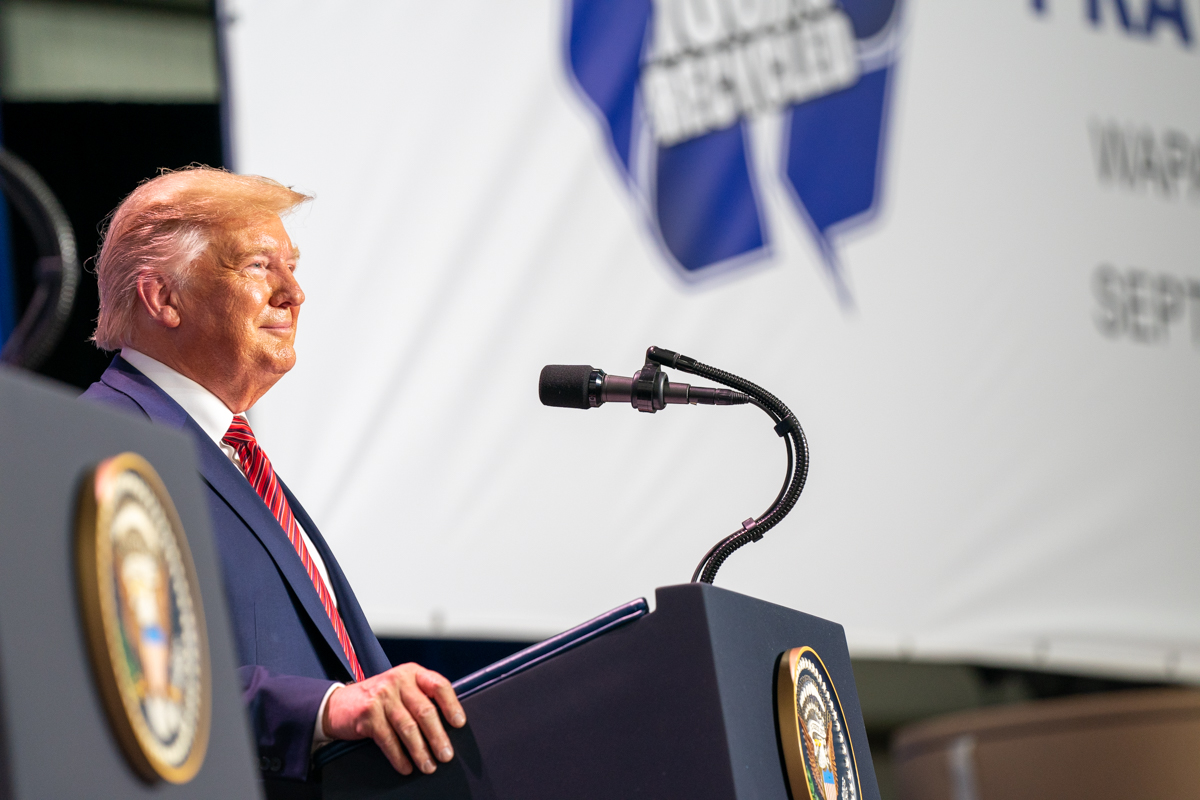
Trump used an 18-inch condenser microphone, a change from the usual dual Shure SM57s

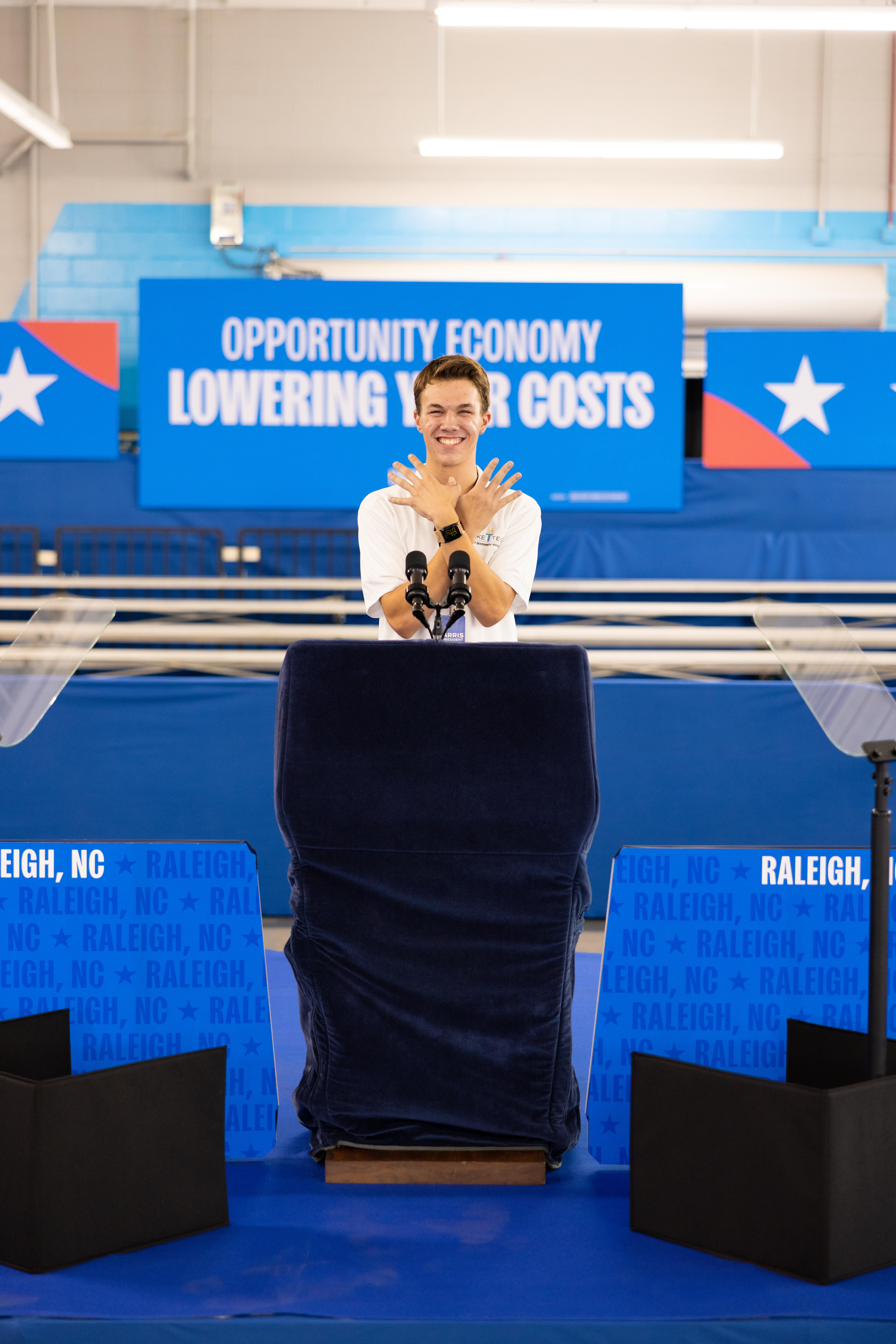
The Blue Goose lectern under its protective covering in 2024

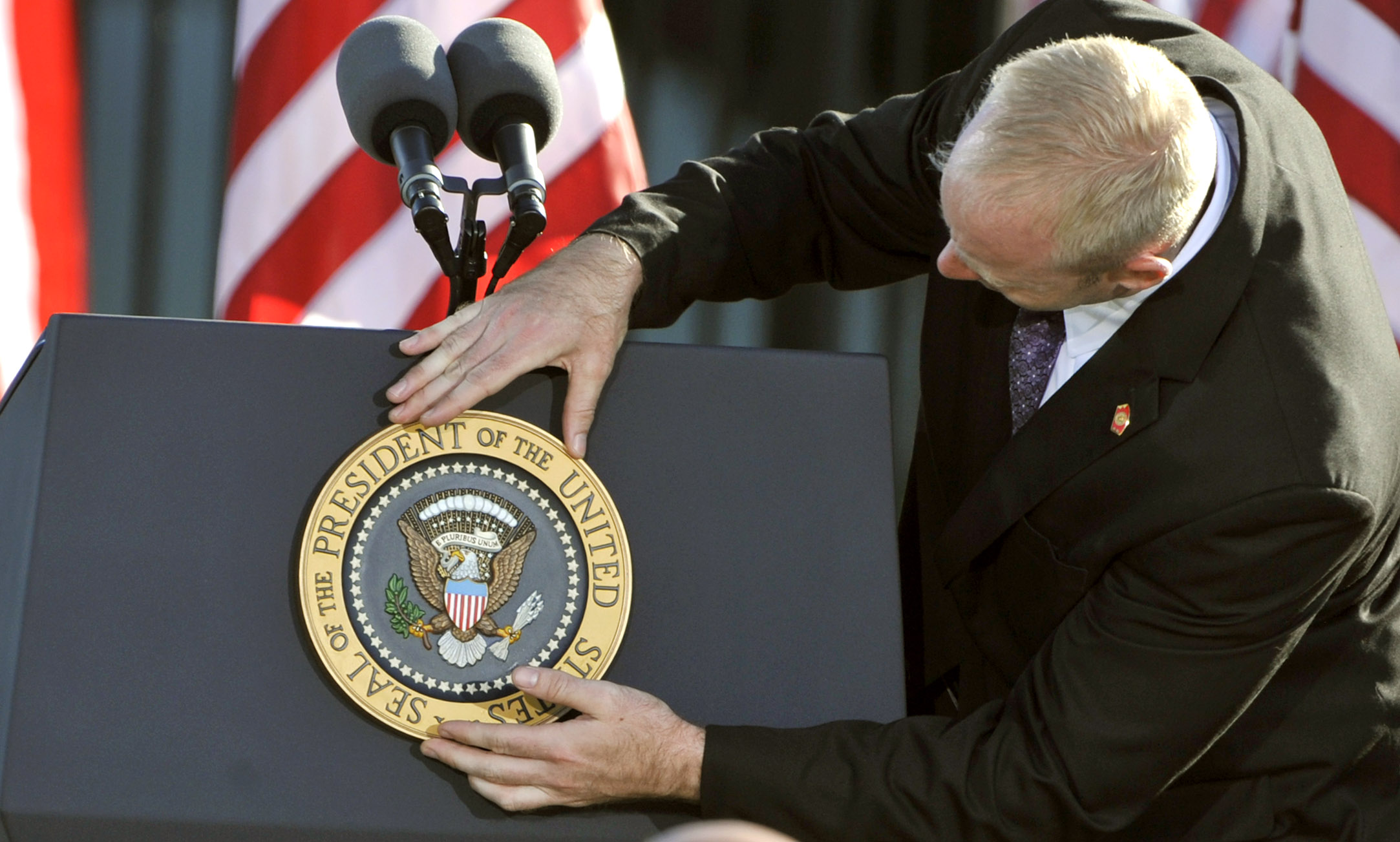
An aide affixes the presidential seal to the lectern before a 2012 speech

== See also ==
- 10 Downing Street lecterns
- Air Force One
- Nuclear football
- Presidential state car (United States)
