= Resignation =

Formal act of quitting one's position

Resignation is the formal act of relinquishing or vacating one's office or position. A resignation can occur when a person holding a position gained by election or appointment steps down, but leaving a position upon the expiration of a term, or choosing not to seek an additional term, is not considered resignation.

When an employee chooses to leave a position, it is considered a resignation, as opposed to involuntary termination. Whether an employee resigned or was terminated is sometimes a topic of dispute, because in many situations, a terminated employee is eligible for severance pay and/or unemployment benefits, whereas one who voluntarily resigns may not be eligible. Abdication is the equivalent of resignation for a reigning monarch, pope, or holder of another similar position.

== Political examples ==
President Nixon's last farewell gesture after his resignation in 1974.

A resignation is a personal decision to exit a position, though outside pressure exists in many cases. For example, Richard Nixon resigned from the office of President of the United States in August 1974 following the Watergate scandal, when he was almost certain to have been impeached by the United States Congress.

=== Deliberate manoeuvre ===
Resignation can be used as a political manoeuvre, as in the Philippines in July 2005, when ten cabinet officials resigned en masse to pressure President Gloria Macapagal Arroyo to follow suit over allegations of electoral fraud. Arroyo's predecessor, Joseph Estrada, was successfully forced out of office during the EDSA Revolution of 2001 as he faced the first impeachment trial held in the country's history.

In 1995, the British Prime Minister, John Major, resigned as Leader of the Conservative Party in order to contest a leadership election with the aim of silencing his critics within the party and reasserting his authority. Having resigned, he stood again and was re-elected. He continued to serve as prime minister until he was defeated in the 1997 elections. Similarly, and also in the UK, Nigel Farage announced on 7 July 2026 that he was resigning as an MP to trigger a by-election in Clacton, Essex, and that he intended to stand for re-election.

However, ascertaining whether an employee had an intent to resign depends on all the circumstances. As noted by the Ontario Superior Court of Justice, an employee's storming off may not legally be a resignation.

=== When criticised ===
Although government officials may tender their resignations, they are not always accepted. This could be a gesture of confidence in the official, as with US President George W. Bush's refusal of his Secretary of Defense Donald Rumsfeld's twice-offered resignation during the Abu Ghraib prison abuse scandal.

However, refusing a resignation can be a method of severe censure if it is followed by dismissal; Alberto Fujimori attempted to resign as President of Peru, but his resignation was refused so that Congress could impeach him.

== Delivery ==
For many public figures, primarily departing politicians, resignation is an opportunity to deliver a valedictory resignation speech in which they can elucidate the circumstances of their exit from office and in many cases deliver a powerful speech which often commands much attention. This can be used to great political effect, particularly as, subsequent to resigning, government ministers are no longer bound by collective responsibility and can speak with greater freedom about current issues.

"Spending more time with family" is a common reason cited during public resignations, especially as a euphemism when receding from scandal.

== Other organisations ==
In academia, a university president or the editor of a scientific journal may also resign, particularly in cases where an idea which runs counter to the mainstream is being promoted. In 2006, Harvard president Larry Summers resigned after making the provocative suggestion that the underrepresentation of female academics in math and science could be due to factors other than sheer discrimination, such as personal inclination or innate ability.

In a club, society, or other voluntary association, a member may resign from an officer position in that organization or even from the organization itself. In Robert's Rules of Order, this is called a request to be excused from a duty. A resignation may also be withdrawn.

The Catholic Church introduced provision at the Second Vatican Council (1963-1965) for its bishops to resign if they "become less capable of fulfilling their duties properly because of the increasing burden of age or some other serious reason".

== See also ==
- Lists of resignations
- Resignation from the British House of Commons
- Resignation from the United States Senate
- Request to be excused from a duty
- Resignation syndrome
- Dismissal (employment) § Changes of conditions
- Resignation services
