= 10 Downing Street lecterns =

Lectern formerly used by the UK prime minister

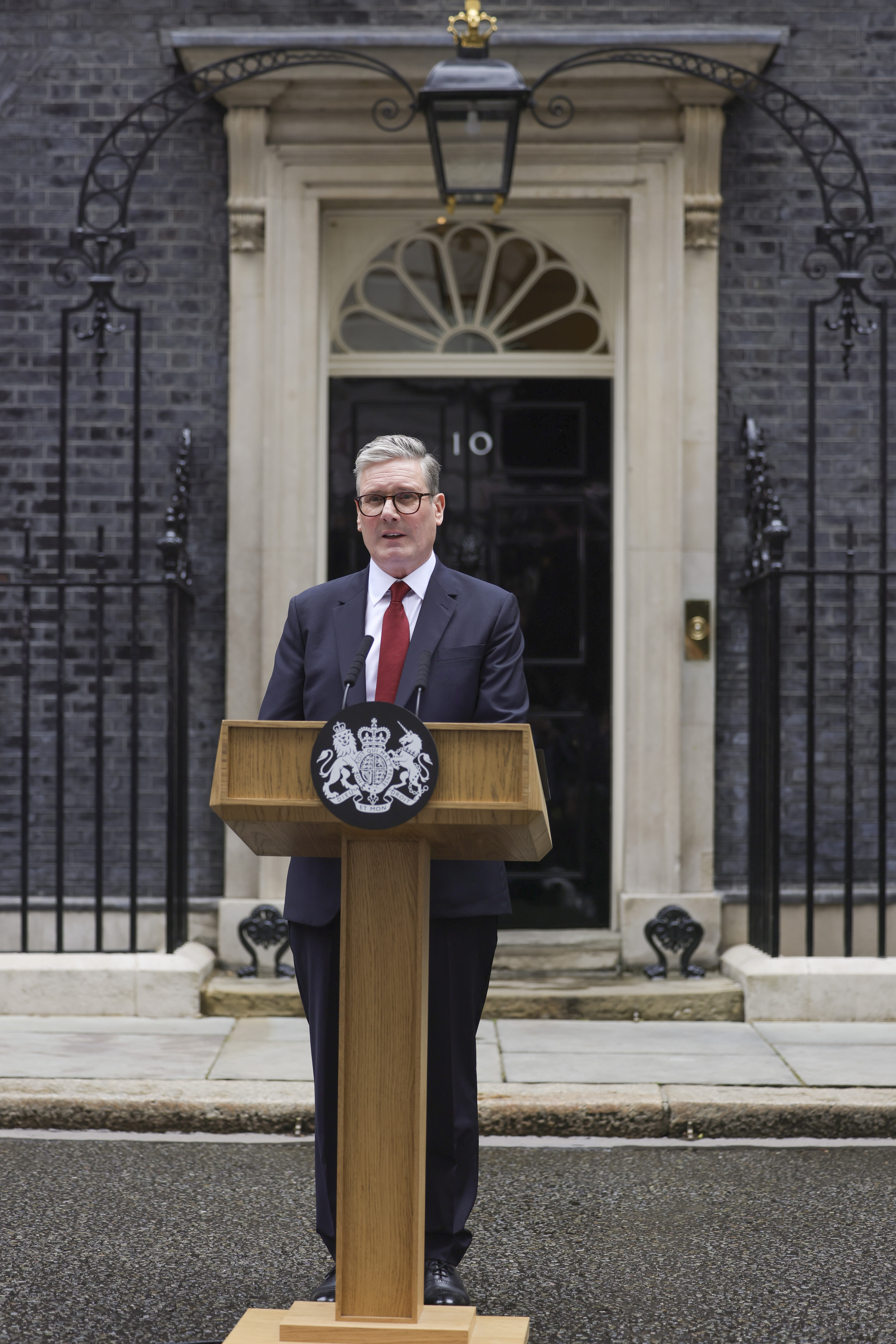
Keir Starmer's first speech using his predecessor's lectern (2024)

From 2010 to 2026, a lectern was used by the prime minister of the United Kingdom, typically outside the door of 10 Downing Street, for addresses to the nation, the announcement of general elections, and resignation speeches.

The lecterns normally displayed the coat of arms of the United Kingdom for government business; when a speech concerned party-political business, the coat of arms was removed. They were made of wood, but also featured a metal core to ensure they were not blown over in the wind.

Although Downing Street denied in October 2022 that each prime minister was allowed to order a new lectern, stating instead that they were "routinely updated", each Conservative prime minister from David Cameron to Rishi Sunak had their own design, which was considered symbolic of a prime minister's intended public image. Labour prime minister Keir Starmer continued to use Sunak's lectern design for his tenure. Andy Burnham did not use a lectern for his first prime ministerial speech on 20 July 2026.

== History ==
Until 2010, prime ministers used generic lecterns, or simply used a microphone stand to deliver speeches outside Number 10.

=== 2010–2024: Conservative Party government ===
Conservative prime minister David Cameron was the first to have a custom-built lectern, designed by his head of operations Liz Sugg to appear "statesmanlike," with a curved, flared column, lighter wood and glossy finish. It was also the first to use the royal coat of arms on the front of its desk section.

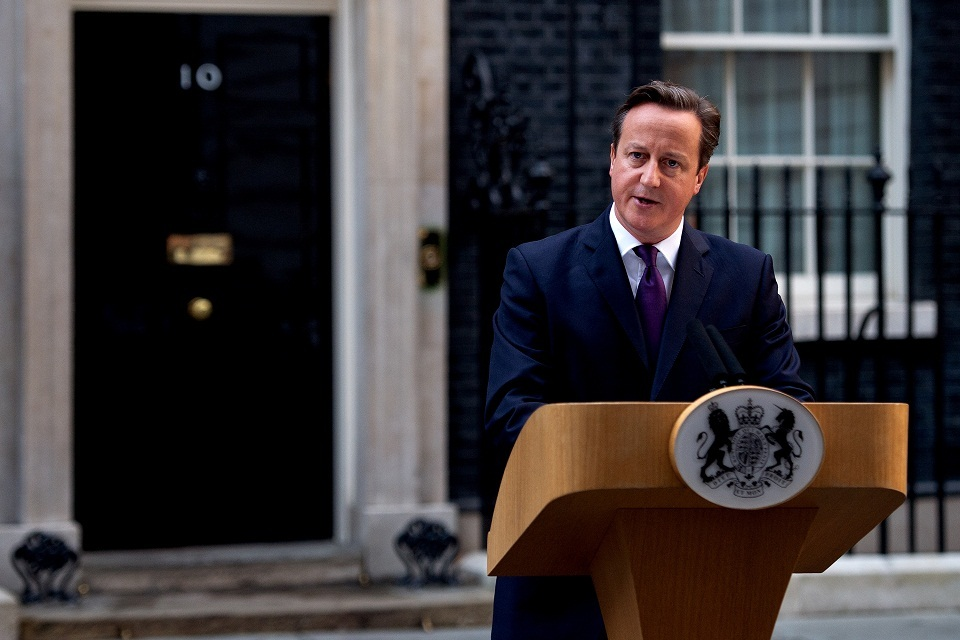
David Cameron making a speech with his, the first bespoke lectern (2010)

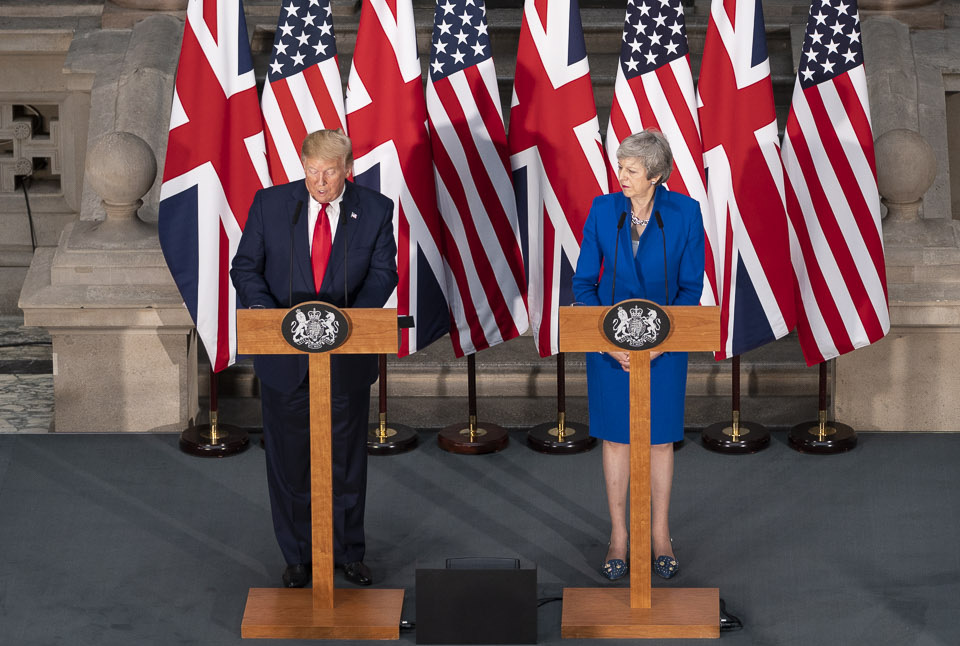
Theresa May and US president Donald Trump used lecterns designed for her tenure in a 2019 Downing Street press conference

Theresa May used a cedar-wood lectern, designed by Fiona Hill, joint Downing Street Chief of Staff, to look more feminine. Its base was unusually wider than its desk. May used the lectern for frequent updates concerning Brexit negotiations, and for her resignation.

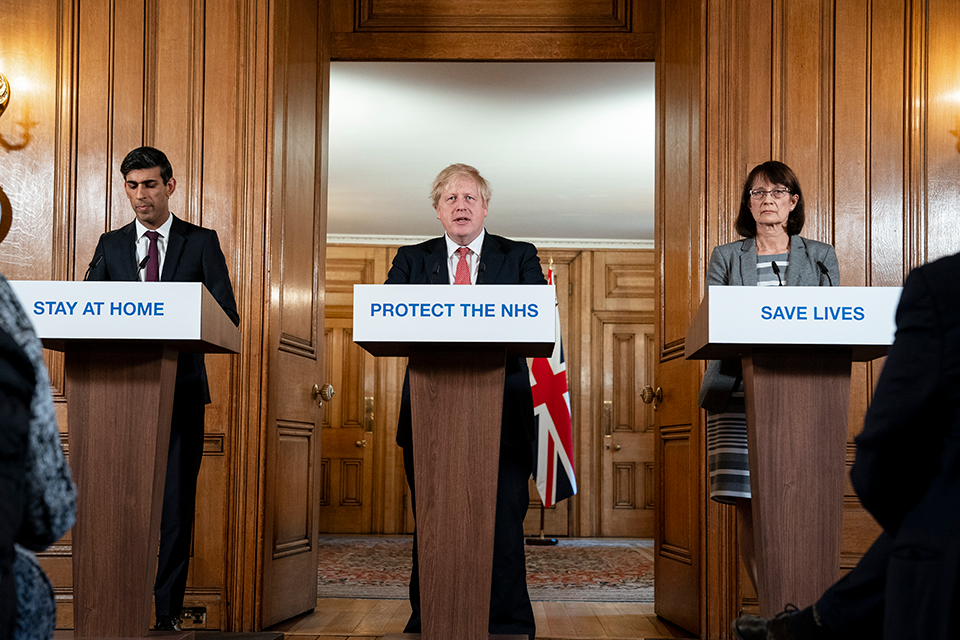
Boris Johnson's dark brown lecterns were used in press conferences about COVID-19 (2020)

The lectern made for Boris Johnson featured a triangular wedge-shaped stand and stepped plinth with a darker wood and sturdier design than May's lectern. It was the first of these lecterns to be dark brown and the first to have a two-tiered base, and was designed to be more sturdy against Johnson thumping on it when he delivered speeches.

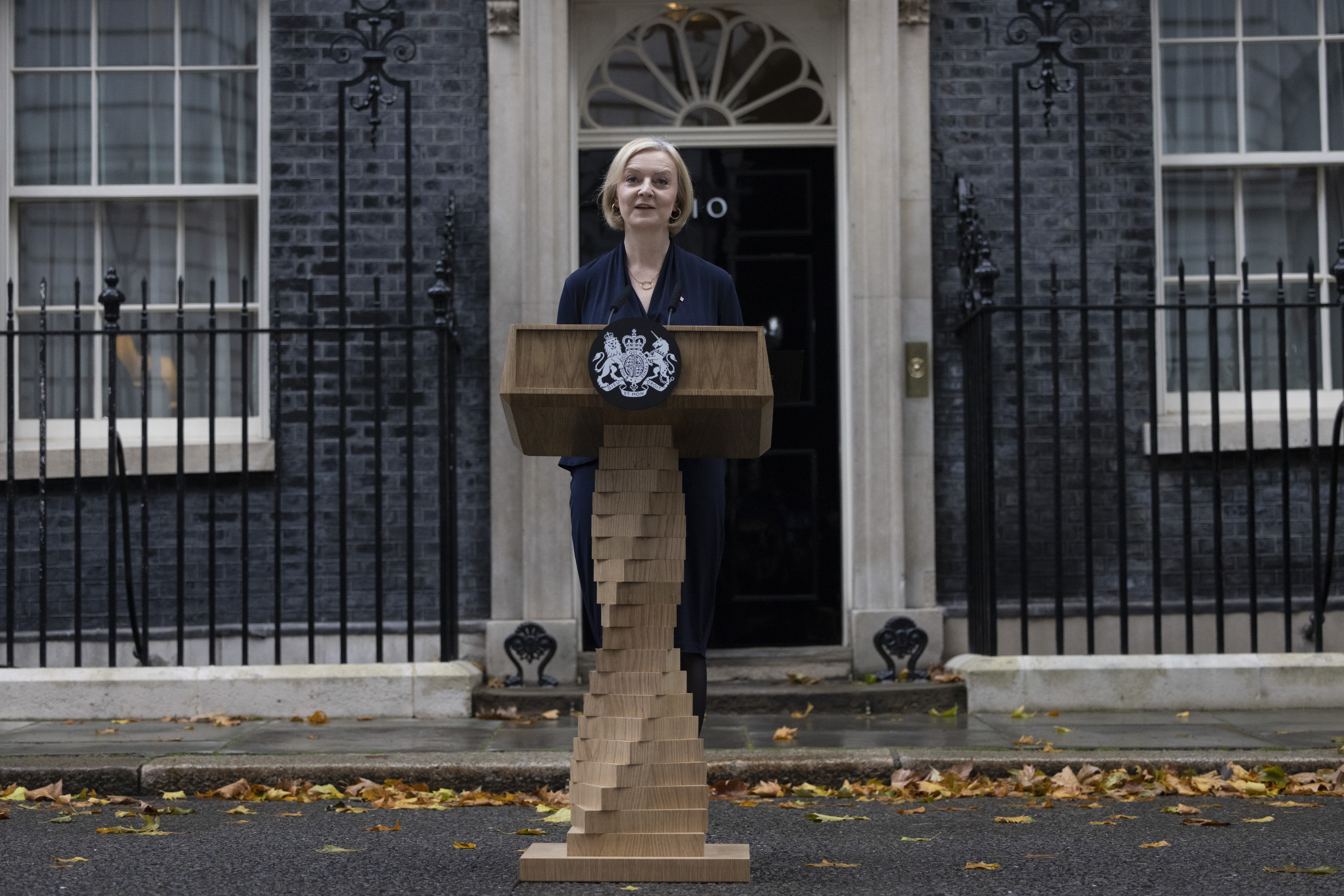
Liz Truss spoke at her custom-built lectern during her resignation as Conservative leader and PM in 2022

Two lecterns with the same design were made for Liz Truss; one paid for by the government and the other paid for by the Conservative Party, which was used for party events. The government lectern used in Downing Street, cost £4,175 to make and was used for two addresses to the nation, including the death of Queen Elizabeth II and the dismissal of Kwasi Kwarteng as Chancellor of the Exchequer. On her first day in office, the lectern was covered in a black bin bag due to the rain. Initially, the lectern's design was intended to incorporate wood from trees around the UK, but this was deemed too expensive. The Daily Telegraph, The Guardian and Evening Standard likened the lectern's design to Jenga blocks. Labour Deputy Leader Angela Rayner criticised the purchase and the cost to the public.

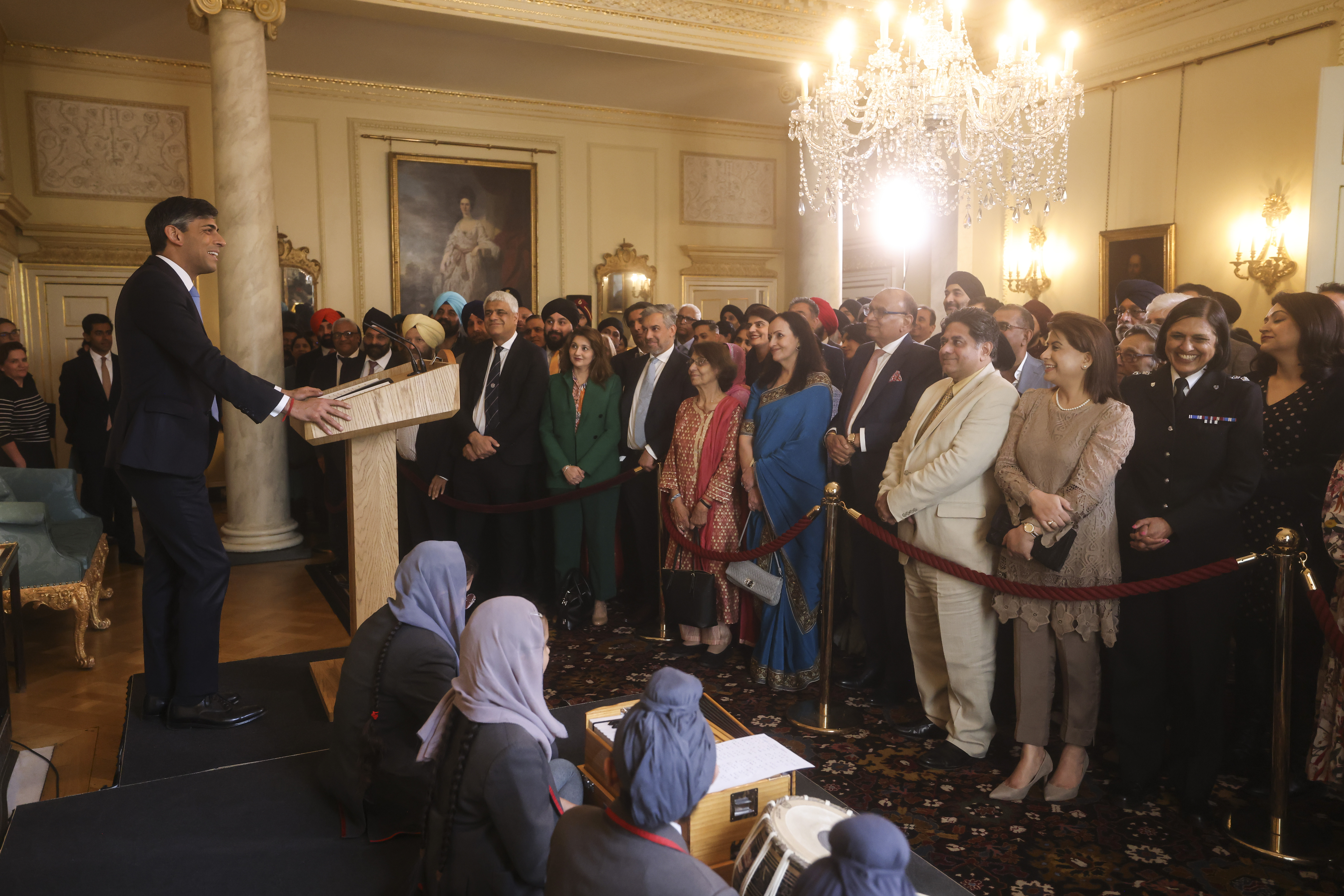
Rishi Sunak's lectern features the same top as Truss's, but uses a simple straight column (2024)

Rishi Sunak's lectern was not custom-built for his tenure, because of the quick completion of the October 2022 Conservative Party leadership election. Instead, Sunak used a lectern from the previous leadership which had cost £3,050. The lectern was similar to that of his predecessor, but was made with a lighter wood, appeared to be slightly smaller, and had a straight column rather than Truss's curved block design.

=== 2024–present: Labour Party government ===
In his first speech at 10 Downing Street following the 2024 general election, Labour Prime Minister Keir Starmer used the same lectern as Sunak.

Andy Burnham did not use a lectern at all for his first prime ministerial speech on 20 July 2026; two microphones were instead used on a stand in front of him. He did not refer to any notes. BBC News journalist Chris Mason remarked that this reflected Burnham's style of communication during his time as Mayor of Greater Manchester, whereas Paul Seddon, also of BBC News, suggested Burnham was "conscious that 'lectern moments' have become a symbol of the UK's political instability in recent years".

== 'Hot Podium Guy' ==
Tobias Gough (born 1983 or 1984), nicknamed "Hot Podium Guy", is a sound engineer from Longfield, Kent, who works for the company MGi London. He is Downing Street's sound technician, having set up and tested the lecterns for five prime ministers as of June 2026. He is known for his perceived physical attractiveness; he wears a tight-fitting black T-shirt, and is muscular. He is also noted for his consistency and longevity, in contrast to the United Kingdom's changing prime ministers. He has a wife, Tina.

In 2019, he first received media attention after setting up Theresa May's custom lectern for her resignation speech. For this, he was nicknamed "Hot Podium Guy". Following this first bout of attention, he initially stated that "it was great lighting to make me look that good, the sun must have been at the right angle. I can assure people that I don't usually look as well as that – I won't be going into the modelling business just yet." Gough would later receive further attention for setting up the lecterns of subsequent prime ministers, particularly for the resignation of Boris Johnson and Liz Truss, Rishi Sunak's first address as Prime Minister, and Keir Starmer's resignation. Prior to the latter, Gough was discussed on the BBC's morning broadcast. The New York Times has noted that he should more appropriately be known as the 'hot lectern guy' according to their style guide.

== See also ==
- Presidential lecterns of the United States
- Downing Street Press Briefing Room
- Prime Ministerial Car
- Larry (cat)
