= Lectern =

Reading desk on which documents or books are placed as support for reading aloud

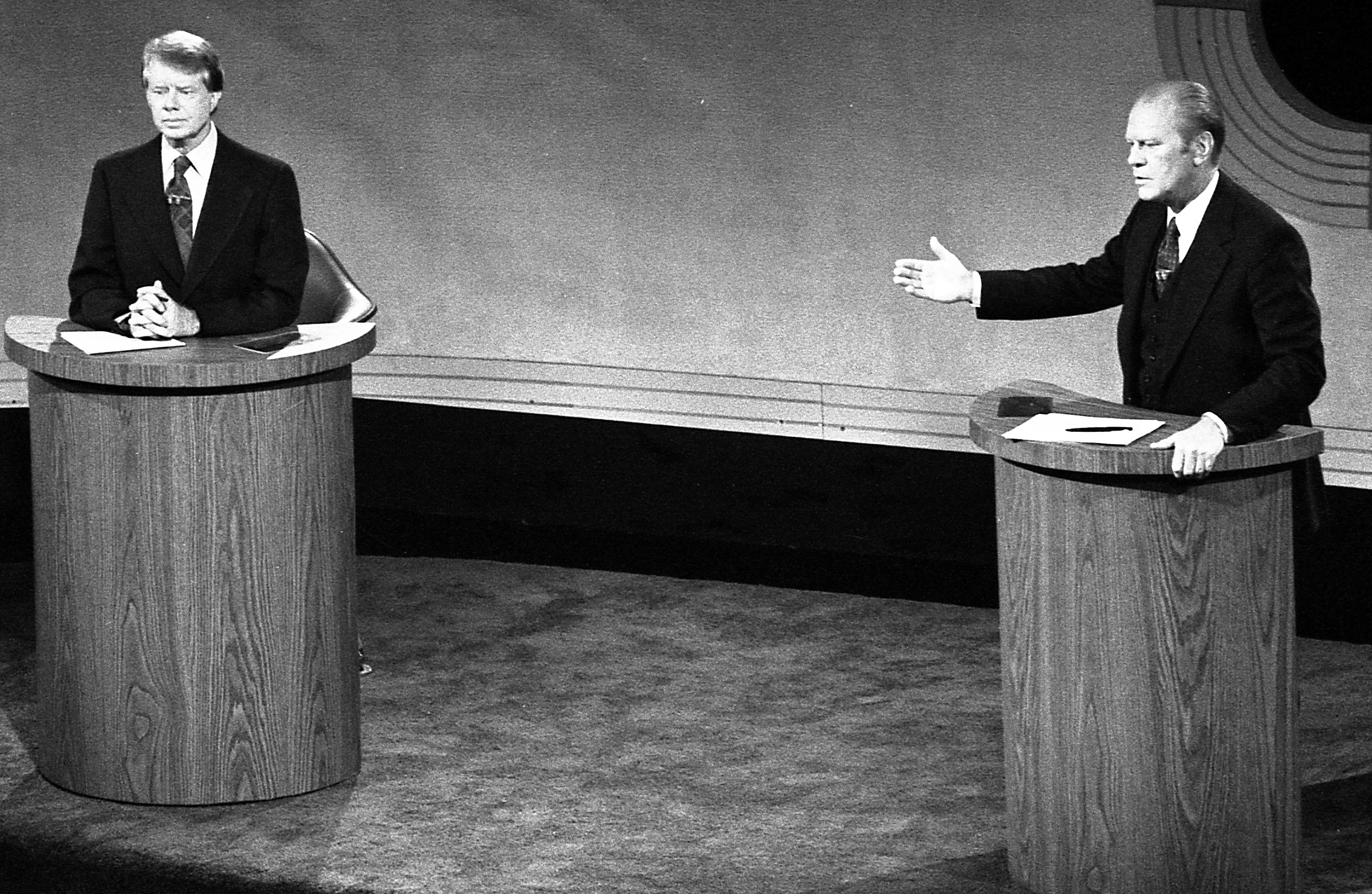
United States presidential candidates Gerald Ford and Jimmy Carter stand behind lecterns at a debate prior to the 1976 presidential election.

A lectern is a standing reading desk with a slanted top, on which documents or books are placed as support for reading aloud, as in a scripture reading, lecture, or sermon. A lectern is usually attached to a stand or affixed to some other form of support. To facilitate eye contact and improve posture when facing an audience, lecterns may have adjustable height and slant. People reading from a lectern, called lectors, generally do so while standing.

The word has its origins in the medieval Latin term lectrum, related to legere which means 'to read'. In pre-modern usage, the word lectern was used to refer specifically to the "reading desk or stand ... from which the Scripture lessons (lectiones) ... are chanted or read." One 1905 dictionary states that "the term is properly applied only to the class mentioned [church book stands] as independent of the pulpit." By the 1920s, however, the term was being used in a broader sense; for example, in reference to a memorial service in Carnegie Hall, it was stated that "the lectern from which the speakers talked was enveloped in black." Lecterns are frequently also incorrectly referred to as podiums, a word which refers to an elevated platform upon which a lectern is placed, derived from the Latin root pod-, meaning 'feet'.

== Academic use ==
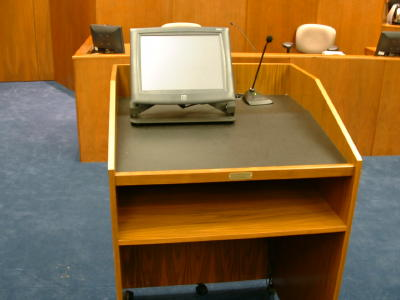
A lectern in a US District Courthouse, similar to those found in academic lecture theatres

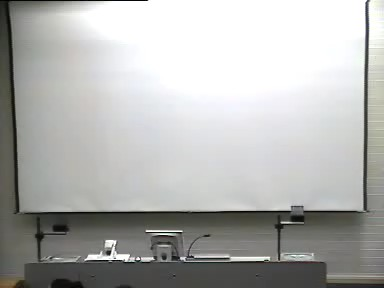
An early-twenty-first century lectern at the University of Canberra (2008)

Lecterns used in academia—generally in seminar rooms and lecture theatres—may have certain features that common lecterns lack, based on the technological sophistication of the venue. These features usually include a microphone stand, audio-visual controls, sometimes even an integrated computer and recording system. Lecterns of this sort are generally attached or integrated into a large desk, as the amount of support material tends to be larger in academic contexts than in straightforward public talks.

== Religious use ==
=== Christianity ===
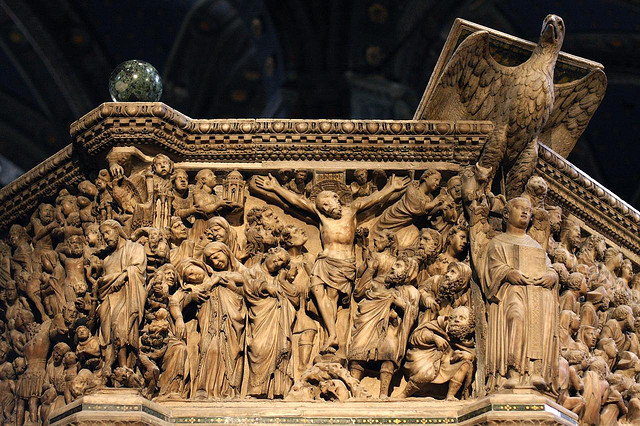
Crucifixion panel and eagle lectern from the Siena Cathedral Pulpit, by Nicola Pisano, 1268

In the Christian Church, the lectern is usually the stand on which the Bible or other texts rest and from which the "lessons" (scripture passages, often selected from a lectionary) are read during the service. The lessons may be read or chanted by a priest, deacon, minister, or layperson, depending upon the liturgical traditions of the community. The lectern is normally set in front of the pews, so that the reader or speaker faces the congregation.

Lecterns are often made of wood. They may be either fixed in place or portable. A lectern differs from a pulpit, the latter being used for sermons though, especially historically, many pulpits include a built in lectern, for example Siena Cathedral Pulpit (Nicola Pisano, 1268). Churches that have both a lectern and a pulpit will often place them on opposite sides. The lectern will generally be smaller than the pulpit, and both may be adorned with antipendia in the color of the liturgical season.

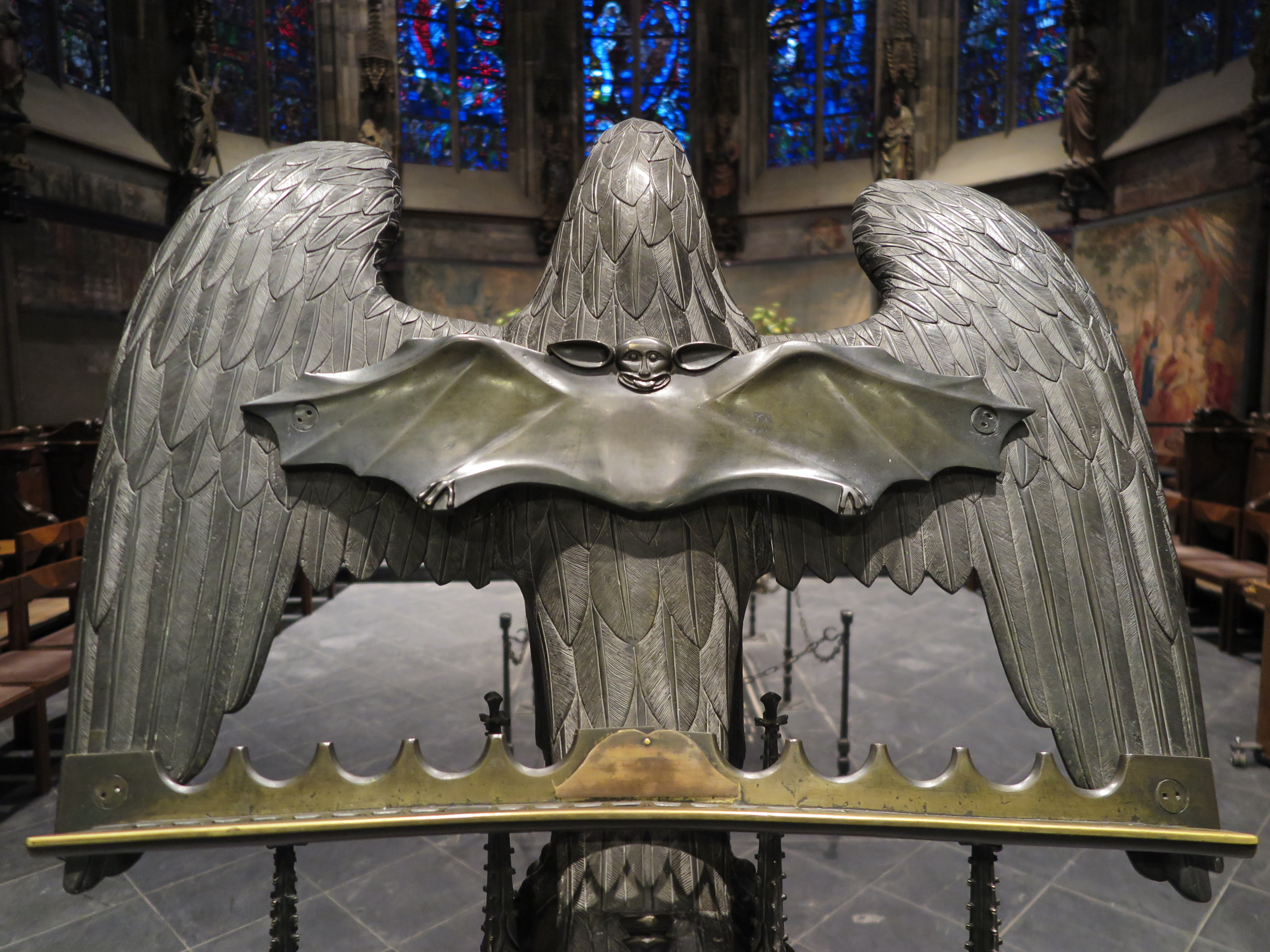
Eagle lectern in the choir hall of Aachen Cathedral with a bat cast in 1874 in Stolberg. The bat on the eagle's back serves to stabilize the damaged lectern.

In monastic churches and cathedrals, a separate lectern is commonly set in the centre of the choir. Originally this would have carried the antiphonal book, for use by the cantor or precentor leading the singing of the divine office. Eagle-shaped lecterns are common, though some, rather rarely, instead take the form of a pelican, or an angel.

In the Eastern Orthodox and Eastern Catholic Churches, a lectern on which icons or the Gospel Book are placed for veneration is called an analogion. It may also be used for reading from liturgical books during the divine services.

=== Judaism ===
Because the Torah scrolls are generally large, the central feature of the bimah in a synagogue is a table large enough to hold an open Torah along with a tikkun or Chumash (reference books used to check the reading). In some synagogues, this table may resemble a large lectern. The Hebrew term for this article of furniture is amud (Hebrew: עמוד).

In traditional yeshivas and some synagogues, students and members of the congregation may use small desks called shtenders (Yiddish: שטענדער). These closely resemble conventional lecterns, and indeed, one shtender may be used as a lectern by the hazzan leading the service. Each study group in a yeshivah may have its own shtender and in some older synagogues individual members of the congregation may have their own shtenders.

Traditional shtenders frequently incorporate a locker under the desktop where prayer books and study material may be locked when not in use, and many feature a footrest for comfort during extended study sessions or standing prayers. Some older synagogues have large collections of shtenders.

=== Islam ===
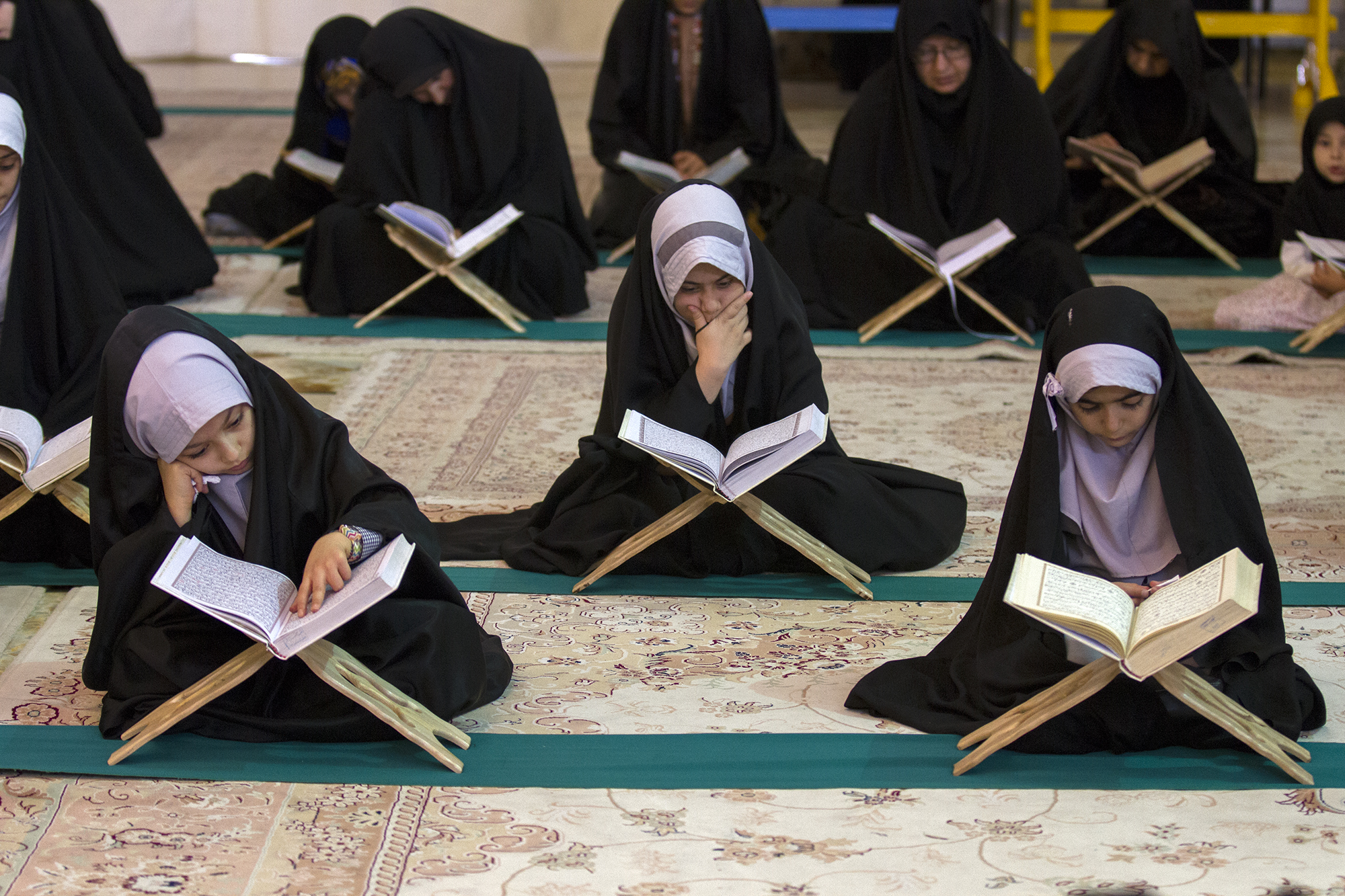
Shia Muslim girls studying the Quran placed atop folding lecterns (rehal) during Ramadan in Qom, Iran

In Islam, lecterns are often used when studying in Islamic seminaries or reading and learning the Qur'an while sitting on the floor, called rehal. The name "rehal" ultimately derives from the Arabic word rahl (رَحْل) meaning "camel saddle", referring to the resemblance of the unfolded lectern to a saddle.

== Political use ==
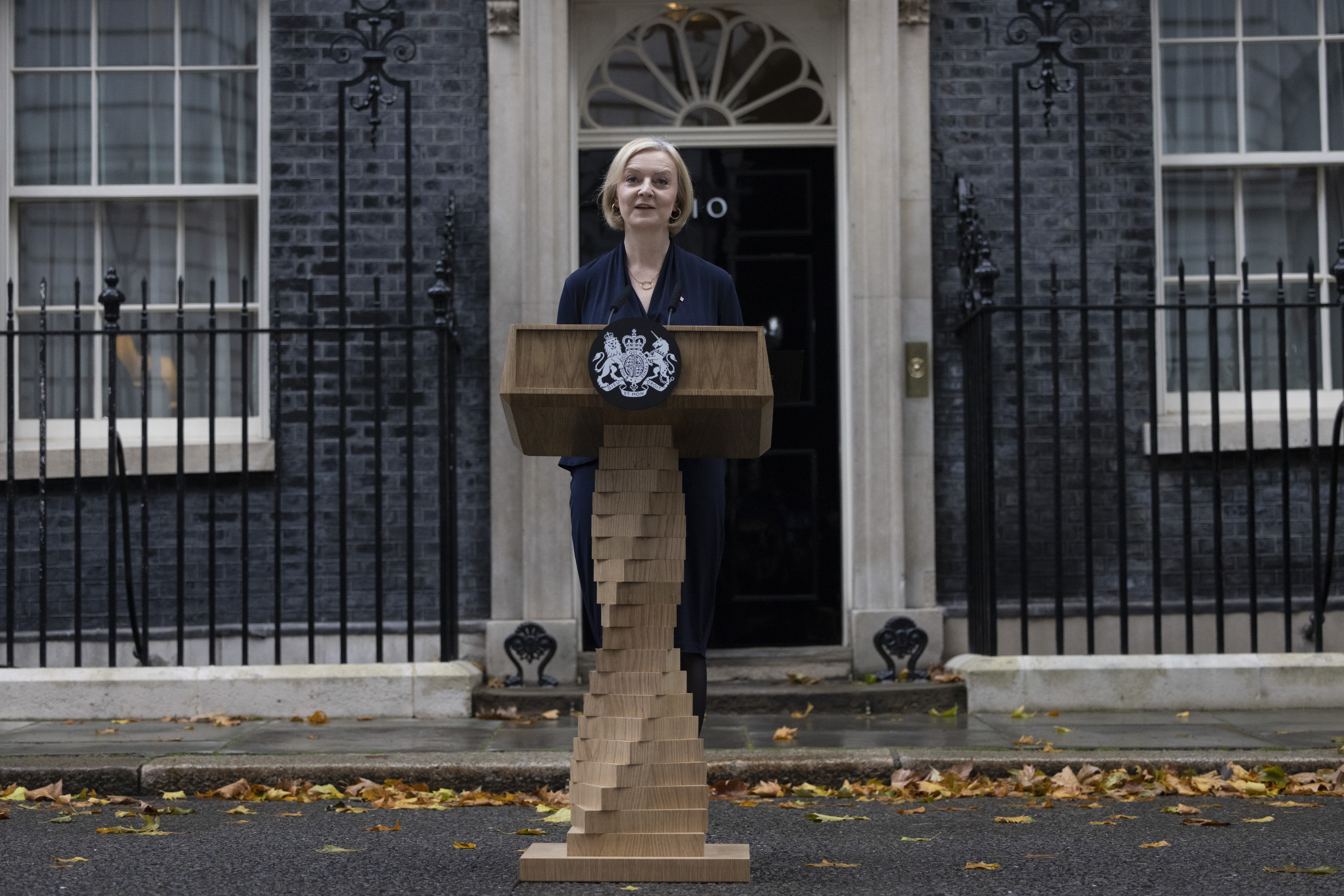
British Prime Minister Liz Truss speaks at her statement lectern during her resignation from government, 2022

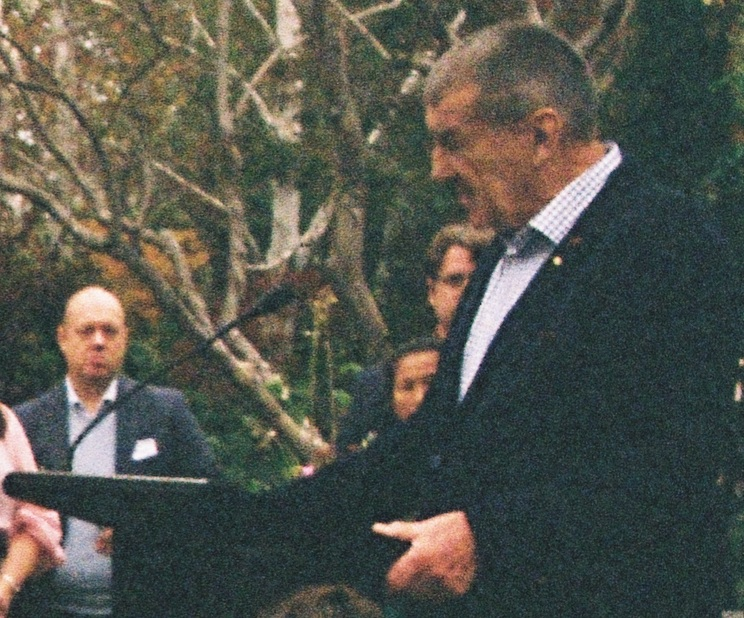
Former Victorian Premier Jeff Kennett speaking from a lectern in 2026

Lecterns are used in political debates on stage, as well as for political speeches. Notable instances of these lecterns include the several types of American Presidential lecterns, of which the most secure is the "Blue Goose", a bulletproof lectern used by the president of the United States, its smaller counterpart the Falcon, and the series of lecterns used for statements outside 10 Downing Street.

== Design features ==
While they are designed in a wide variety of variations, lecterns usually feature a sloped top on which to rest the material to be read. A lip at the bottom of this slope is typically present to prevent this material from sliding off the lectern. The width of a lectern can range from a slender pole to as wide as the lectern's top section. Some modern lecterns feature motorised height adjustment, and sometimes come equipped with a small podium on which to stand.

In addition to their utilitarian reading use, lecterns are often designed with aesthetics in mind. At events, lecterns may bear the name or insignia of the event's sponsor, its speaker, or the venue in which an event is taking place, such as that of a hotel or conference center.

Table lecterns, which are portable lecterns designed to be placed upon tables, are also used.

== See also ==
- Dais
- Podium
- Pulpit
- Rehal (book rest)
- Standing desk

== Bibliography ==
- Herbermann, Charles, ed. (1913). "Lectern" . Catholic Encyclopedia. New York: Robert Appleton Company.
- Parry, Ken; Melling, David J.; Brady, Dimitri; Griffith, Sidney H.; Healey, John F., eds. (1999). The Blackwell Dictionary of Eastern Christianity. Malden, MA.: Blackwell Publishing. ISBN 0-631-23203-6.
