= List of United States presidential visits to East Asia =

An orthographic projection map featuring the countries of East Asia (highlighted in dark green)

Ten United States presidents have made presidential visits to East Asia. The first presidential trip to a country in East Asia was made by Dwight D. Eisenhower (as president-elect) in 1952. Since then, all presidents, except John F. Kennedy, have traveled to one or more nations in the region while in office.

To date, 26 visits have been made to Japan, 21 to South Korea, 15 to China (Note: This is when the United States government recognized the Republic of China as the only legal regime of "China" as president Dwight D. Eisenhower visited Taiwan in 1960. However, Richard Nixon visited the People's Republic of China on mainland China in 1972 and Gerald Ford in 1975 while maintaining relations with the ROC. 11 other visits to mainland China continued on from 1979 onwards following recognition of the PRC.), and one each to Mongolia and to North Korea.

== Table of visit ==
President	Dates	Countries	Locations	Key details
Dwight D. Eisenhower	December 2–5, 1952	South Korea	Seoul	Visit to Korean combat zone. (Visit made as President-elect.)
Dwight D. Eisenhower	June 18–19, 1960	Taiwan	Taipei	State visit. Met with President Chiang Kai-shek
Dwight D. Eisenhower	June 19–20, 1960	South Korea	Seoul	Met with Prime Minister Heo Jeong. Addressed the National Assembly.
Lyndon B. Johnson	October 31 – November 2, 1966	South Korea	Seoul, Suwon	State visit. Met with President Park Chung-hee and Prime Minister Chung Il-kwon. Addressed National Assembly.
Richard Nixon	February 21–28, 1972	China	Shanghai, Beijing, Hangzhou	State Visit. Met with CCP chairman Mao Zedong and Premier Zhou Enlai.
Gerald Ford	November 19–22, 1974	Japan	Tokyo, Kyoto	State visit. Met with Prime Minister Kakuei Tanaka.
Gerald Ford	November 22–23, 1974	South Korea	Seoul	Met with President Park Chung-hee.
Gerald Ford	December 1–5, 1975	China	Beijing	Official visit. Met with CCP chairman Mao Zedong and Vice Premier Deng Xiaoping
Jimmy Carter	June 25–29, 1979	Japan	Tokyo, Shimoda	State visit; met with Emperor Hirohito and Prime Minister Masayoshi Ōhira. Attended the 5th G7 summit.
Jimmy Carter	June 29 – July 1, 1979	South Korea	Seoul	State visit. Met with President Park Chung-hee and Prime Minister Choi Kyu-hah.
Jimmy Carter	July 9–10, 1980	Japan	Tokyo	Official visit; attended memorial services for former Prime Minister Masayoshi Ōhira; met with Emperor Hirohito, President Ziaur Rahman of Bangladesh, Prime Minister Malcolm Fraser of Australia, Prime Minister Prem Tinsulanonda of Thailand, and Premier Hua Guofeng of China.
Ronald Reagan	November 9–12, 1983	Japan	Tokyo	State visit; met with Emperor Hirohito and Prime Minister Yasuhiro Nakasone and addressed the National Diet.
Ronald Reagan	November 12–14, 1983	South Korea	Seoul, Demilitarized Zone	State visit. Met with President Chun Doo-hwan. Addressed the National Assembly and visited U.S. troops.
Ronald Reagan	April 26 – May 1, 1984	China	Beijing, Xi'an, Shanghai	State visit. Met with CCP general secretary Hu Yaobang, President Li Xiannian and Premier Zhao Ziyang.
Ronald Reagan	May 2–7, 1986	Japan	Tokyo	Attended the 12th G7 summit.
George H. W. Bush	February 23–25, 1989	Japan	Tokyo	Attended the funeral of Emperor Hirohito. Met with Emperor Akihito, the kings of Belgium, Jordan and Spain, the presidents of Brazil, Egypt, France, the Federal Republic of Germany, Israel, Italy, Nigeria, the Philippines, Portugal and Zaire, and the prime ministers of Japan, Pakistan, Singapore, Thailand and Turkey.
George H. W. Bush	February 25–27, 1989	China	Beijing	Met with CCP general secretary Zhao Ziyang, President Yang Shangkun and Premier Li Peng. Also met with Prince Norodom Sihanouk of Cambodia.
George H. W. Bush	February 27, 1989	South Korea	Seoul	Official visit. Addressed the National Assembly.
George H. W. Bush	January 5–7, 1992	South Korea	Seoul	Met with President Roh Tae-woo and senior Korean officials. Also signed a science and technology agreement, addressed the National Assembly, and visited U.S. military personnel.
George H. W. Bush	January 7–10, 1992	Japan	Kyoto, Kashihara, Tokyo	Met with Emperor Akihito, Prime Minister Kiichi Miyazawa and senior Japanese officials.
Bill Clinton	July 6–10, 1993	Japan	Tokyo	Attended the 19th G7 summit. Met with Russian president Boris Yeltsin.
Bill Clinton	July 10–11, 1993	South Korea	Seoul	Met with President Kim Young-sam. Addressed the National Assembly. Visited U.S. military personnel.
Bill Clinton	April 15–16, 1996	South Korea	Cheju Island	Met with President Kim Young-sam. Proposed four-nation peace talks.
Bill Clinton	April 16–18, 1996	Japan	Tokyo	State visit. Issued joint statement on U.S.-Japanese security relations. Addressed the Diet and U.S. Navy personnel.
Bill Clinton	June 24 – July 3, 1998	China	Xi'an, Beijing, Shanghai, Guilin, Hong Kong	State visit. Met with President & CCP general secretary Jiang Zemin. Visited the Forbidden City and the Great Wall of China. Delivered a speech at Peking University.
Bill Clinton	November 19–20, 1998	Japan	Tokyo	Met with Emperor Akihito and Prime Minister Keizō Obuchi. Addressed American Chamber of Commerce.
Bill Clinton	November 20–22, 1998	South Korea	Seoul, Osan	Met with President Kim Dae-jung. Addressed U.S. military personnel.
Bill Clinton	June 8, 2000	Japan	Tokyo	Attended the funeral of former Prime Minister Keizō Obuchi.
Bill Clinton	July 21–23, 2000	Japan	Nago	Attended the 26th G8 summit.
George W. Bush	October 18–21, 2001	China	Shanghai	Attended the APEC Summit.
George W. Bush	February 16–19, 2002	Japan	Tokyo	Met with Emperor Akihito and Prime Minister Junichiro Koizumi. Addressed the Diet.
George W. Bush	February 19–21, 2002	South Korea	Seoul, Dorasan, Osan	Met with President Kim Dae-jung. Visited the Korean Demilitarized Zone. Addressed U.S. military personnel.
George W. Bush	February 21–22, 2002	China	Beijing	Met with President & CCP general secretary Jiang Zemin and Premier Zhu Rongji.
George W. Bush	October 17–18, 2003	Japan	Tokyo	Met with Prime Minister Junichiro Koizumi.
George W. Bush	November 15–16, 2005	Japan	Kyoto	Met with Prime Minister Junichiro Koizumi.
George W. Bush	November 16–20, 2005	South Korea	Pusan, Gyeongju, Osan	Attended the APEC Summit. Met with Russian president Vladimir Putin. Addressed U.S. military personnel.
George W. Bush	November 20–21, 2005	China	Beijing	Met with President & CCP general secretary Hu Jintao and Premier Wen Jiabao.
George W. Bush	November 21, 2005	Mongolia	Ulaanbaatar	Met with President Nambaryn Enkhbayar and Prime Minister Tsakhiagiin Elbegdorj.
George W. Bush	July 6–9, 2008	Japan	Tōyako	Attended the 34th G8 summit. Met with Tanzanian president Jakaya Kikwete, Indian prime minister Manmohan Singh, Chinese leader Hu Jintao and South Korean president Lee Myung-bak.
George W. Bush	August 5–6, 2008	South Korea	Seoul	Met with President Lee Myung-bak. Addressed U.S. military personnel.
George W. Bush	August 7–11, 2008	China	Beijing	Attended the opening ceremonies of the Summer Olympics. Met with President & CCP General Secretary Hu Jintao and Russian Prime Minister Vladimir Putin.
Barack Obama	November 13–14, 2009	Japan	Tokyo	Met with Emperor Akihito and Prime Minister Yukio Hatoyama.
Barack Obama	November 15–18, 2009	China	Shanghai, Beijing	Met with Shanghai Party Secretary Yu Zhengsheng and Mayor Han Zheng; also took part in a town hall meeting with Shanghai students. Met with President & CCP general secretary Hu Jintao, NPC chairman Wu Bangguo and Premier Wen Jiabao. Visited the Forbidden City and the Great Wall of China.
Barack Obama	November 18–19, 2009	South Korea	Seoul, Osan	Met with President Lee Myung-bak. Visited with U.S. troops at Osan Air Base.
Barack Obama	November 10–12, 2010	South Korea	Seoul	Attended the G-20 Summit. Met with President Lee Myung-bak.
Barack Obama	November 12–14, 2010	Japan	Yokohama, Kamakura	Attended the APEC Summit. Met with Prime Minister Naoto Kan.
Barack Obama	March 25–27, 2012	South Korea	Seoul	Attended the Nuclear Security Summit. Met with President Lee Myung-bak. Visited the Korean Demilitarized Zone.
Barack Obama	April 23–25, 2014	Japan	Tokyo	Met with Emperor Akihito and Prime Minister Shinzō Abe.
Barack Obama	April 25–26, 2014	South Korea	Seoul	Met with President Park Geun-hye. Visited with U.S. troops at Yongsan Garrison.
Barack Obama	November 10–12, 2014	China	Beijing	Attended the APEC Summit. Met with President & CCP General Secretary]] Xi Jinping, Premier Li Keqiang and NPC Chairman Zhang Dejiang.
Barack Obama	May 25–27, 2016	Japan	Shima, Hiroshima	Attended the 42nd G7 summit. Visited the Hiroshima Peace Memorial Park.
Barack Obama	September 3–6, 2016	China	Hangzhou	Attended the G-20 Summit.
Donald Trump	November 5–7, 2017	Japan	Tokyo	Met with Emperor Akihito and Prime Minister Shinzō Abe.
Donald Trump	November 7–8, 2017	South Korea	Seoul	State visit. Met with President Moon Jae-in. Addressed the National Assembly.
Donald Trump	November 8–10, 2017	China	Beijing	State visit. Met with President & CCP general secretary Xi Jinping and Premier Li Keqiang.
Donald Trump	May 25–28, 2019	Japan	Tokyo, Yokosuka	State visit. Met with Emperor Naruhito and Prime Minister Shinzō Abe.
Donald Trump	June 27–29, 2019	Japan	Osaka	Attended the G-20 Summit.
Donald Trump	June 29–30, 2019	South Korea	Seoul, Korean Demilitarized Zone	Met with President Moon Jae-in. Visited the Korean Demilitarized Zone. Attended the Koreas–United States DMZ Summit with President Moon and North Korean leader Kim Jong-un at the Inter-Korean Freedom House on the southern side of the Joint Security Area of the Korean Demilitarized Zone. Visited U.S. troops at Osan Air Base.
Donald Trump	June 30, 2019	North Korea	Joint Security Area	Briefly walked into the northern side of the Joint Security Area of the Korean Demilitarized Zone, accompanied by North Korean Leader Kim Jong-un, becoming the first sitting U.S. president to enter North Korea.
Joe Biden	May 20–22, 2022	South Korea	Seoul	Met with President Yoon Suk-yeol. Visited with U.S. troops at Yongsan Garrison.
Joe Biden	May 22–24, 2022	Japan	Tokyo	Met with Emperor Naruhito and Prime Minister Fumio Kishida. Attended the QUAD Leaders Summit with Prime Minister Kishida, Australian prime minister Anthony Albanese, and Indian prime minister Narendra Modi.
Joe Biden	May 18–21, 2023	Japan	Hiroshima	Attended the 49th G7 summit.
Donald Trump	October 27–29, 2025	Japan	Tokyo, Yokosuka	Met with Emperor Naruhito and Prime Minister Sanae Takaichi.
Donald Trump	October 29–30, 2025	South Korea	Busan, Gyeongju	Met with President Lee Jae Myung in Busan. Attended the APEC Summit. Attended the summit meeting with Chinese leader Xi Jinping.
Donald Trump	May 13–15, 2026	China	Beijing	State visit. Met with President & CCP general secretary Xi Jinping.

== Gallery ==
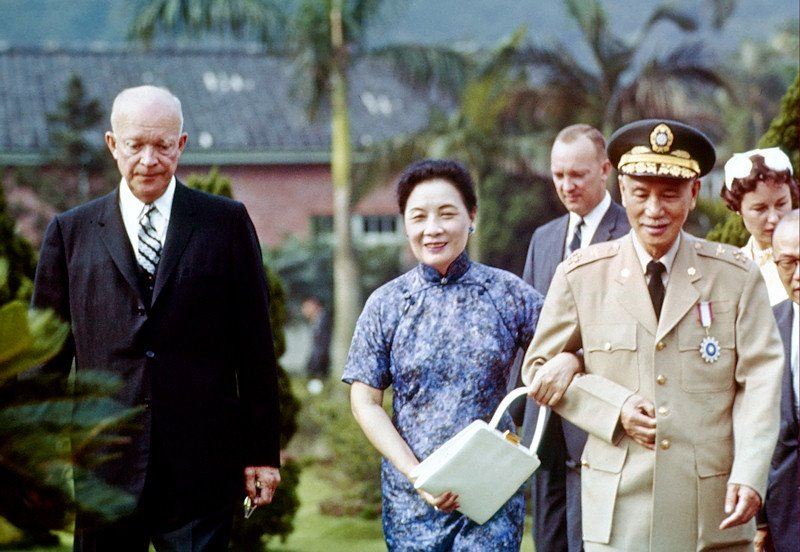
President Dwight D. Eisenhower with Republic of China President Chiang Kai-shek and Madame Chiang Kai-shek in Taipei, Taiwan (Republic of China), June 18, 1960

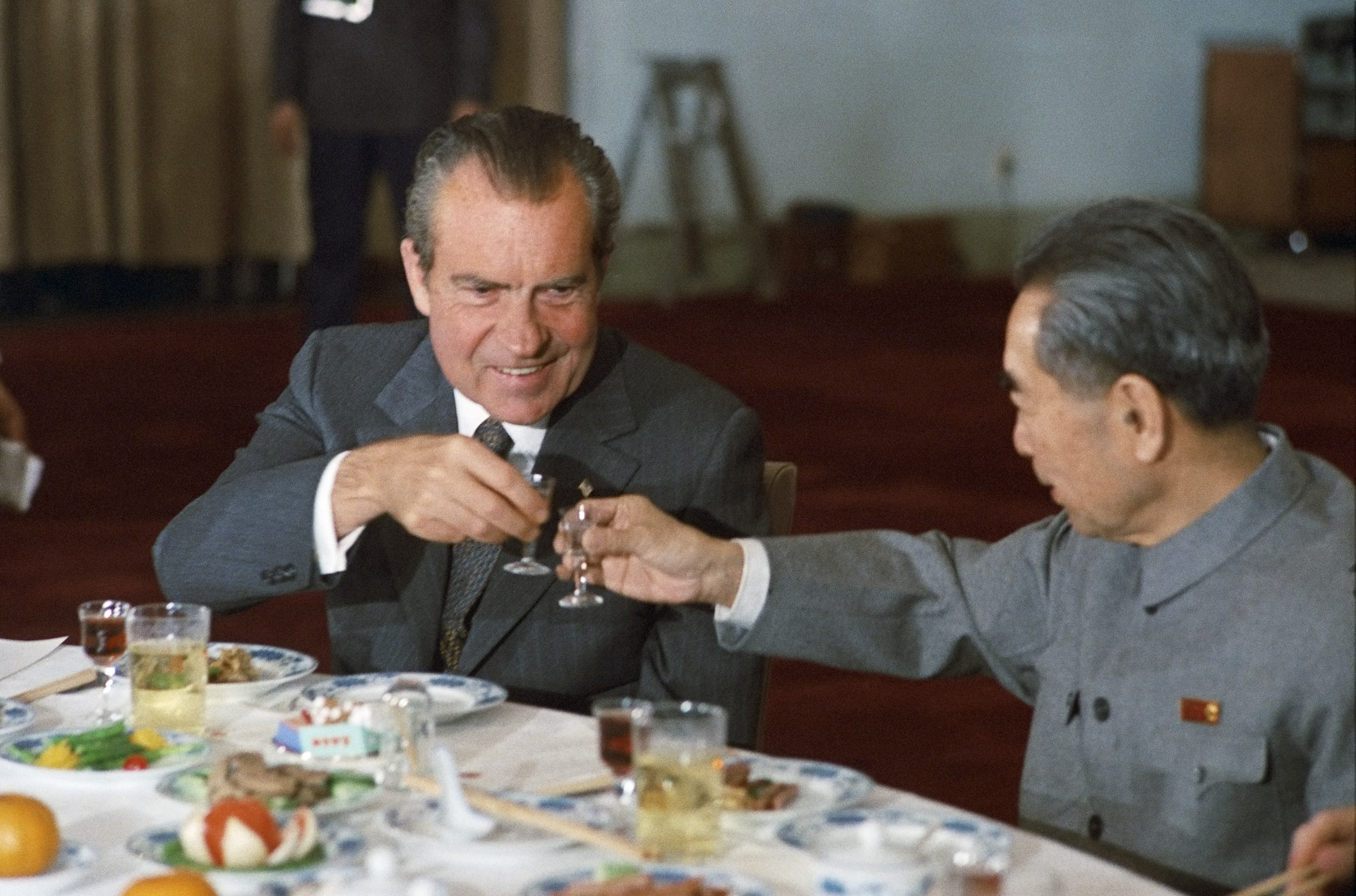
President Richard Nixon and Premier Zhou Enlai in Beijing, China, February 25, 1972

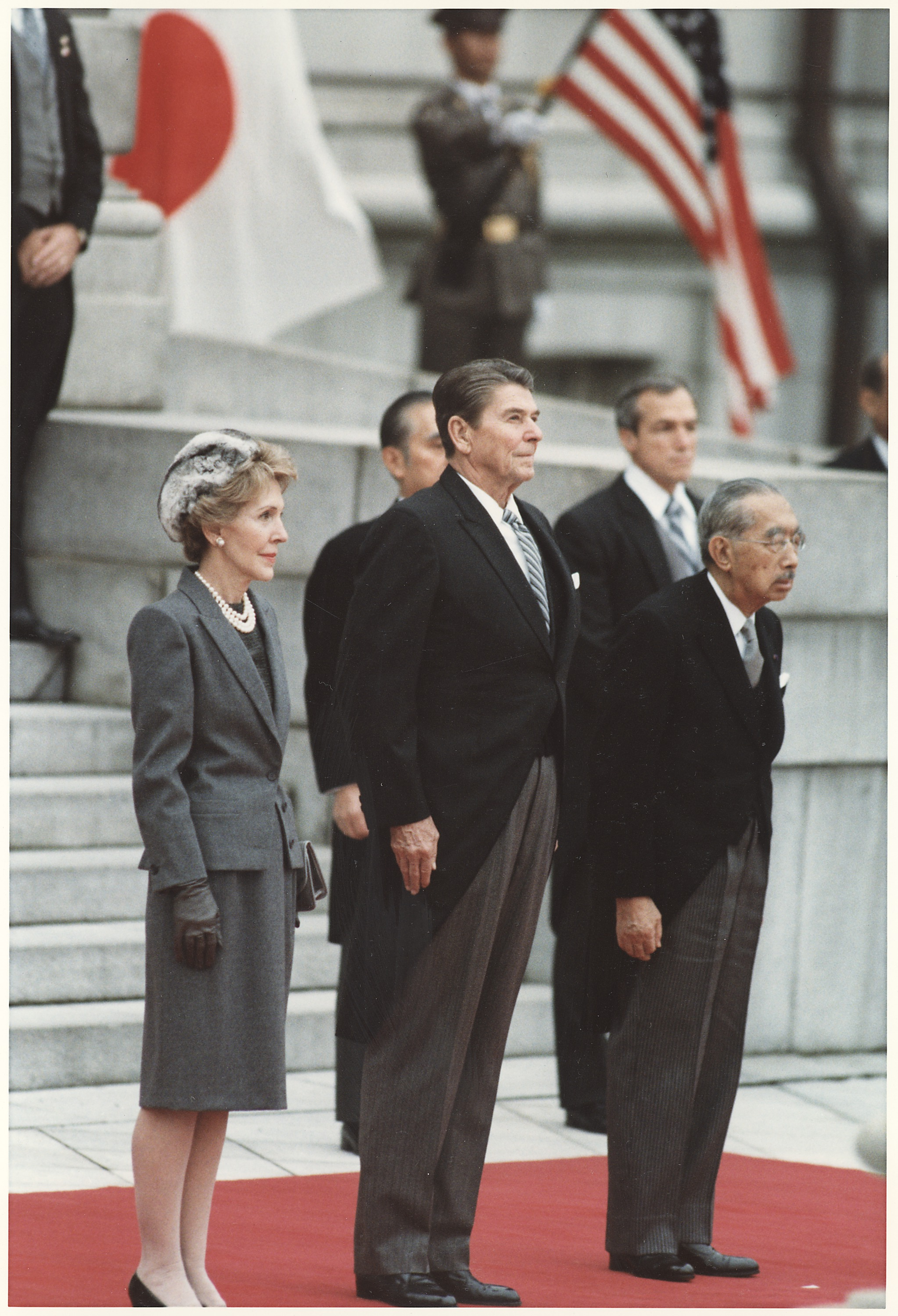
President Ronald Reagan and First Lady Nancy Reagan with Emperor Hirohito in Tokyo, Japan, November 9, 1983

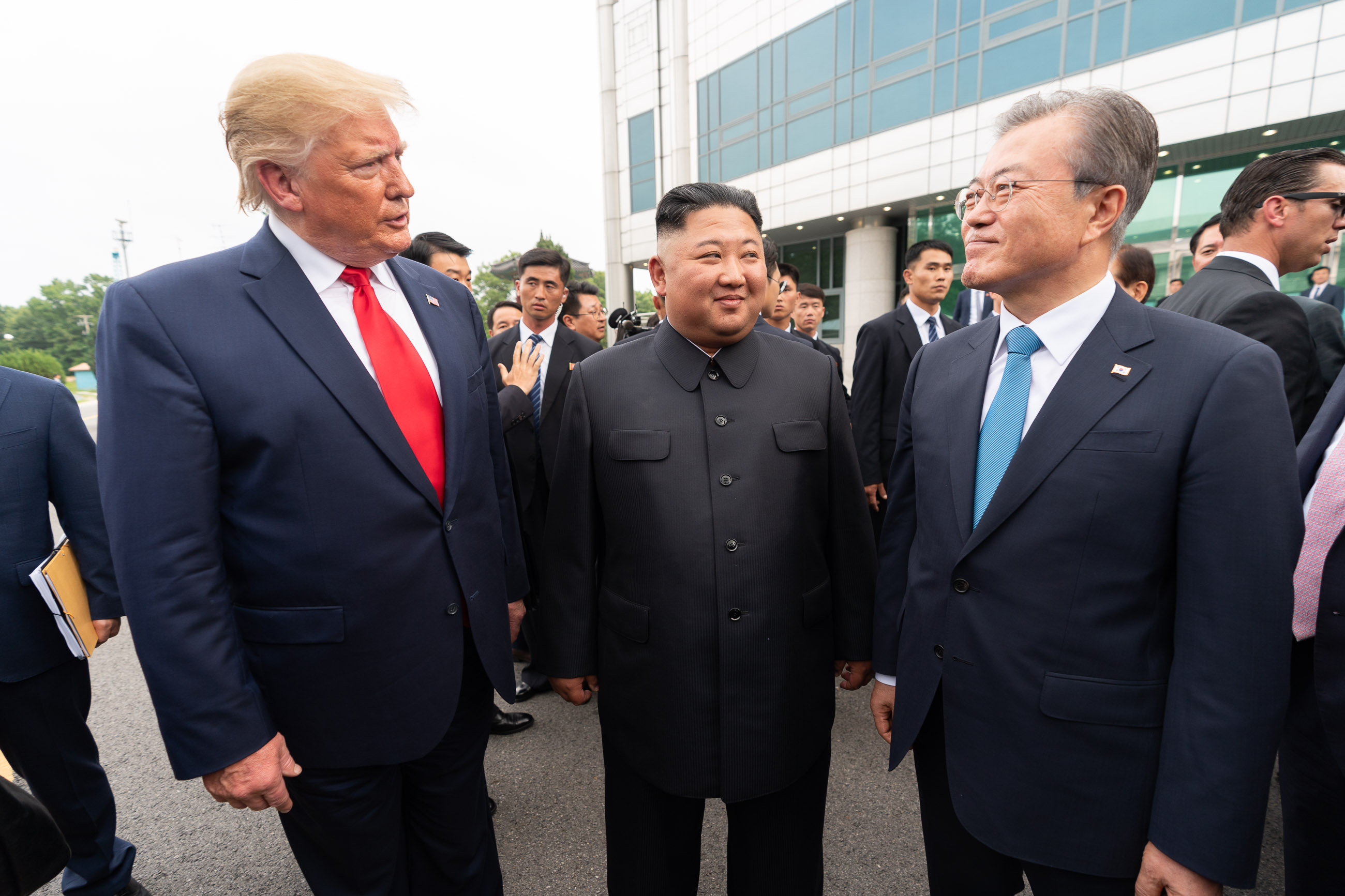
President Donald Trump with Chairman Kim Jong-un and President Moon Jae-in in Korean Demilitarized Zone, June 30, 2019

== Visits by former presidents ==
- Ulysses S. Grant visited Hong Kong, Canton (now Guangzhou), Shanghai, and Peking where he spoke with the head of government, Prince Gong, and Li Hongzhang, Viceroy of Zhili, in 1878, during a world tour after leaving office. He subsequently visited Japan, before returning to the U.S.
- Richard Nixon visited China at the personal invitation of Mao Zedong in February 1976. He visited again in mid–1979, and had a private meeting with Deng Xiaoping in Beijing.
- Jimmy Carter travelled to China, along with Carter Center personnel, for meetings with government and other officials on several occasions: July 1997, September 2003, December 2007, and January 2009. Additionally, Carter has visited North Korea twice: in June 1994 he meet with General Secretary of the Workers' Party of Korea Kim Il Sung in Pyongyang to persuade Kim to negotiate with the Clinton Administration over its nuclear program; and, in August 2010 he met with General Secretary Kim Jong-il in Pyongyang to secure the release of Aijalon Mahli Gomes, an American teacher who was imprisoned in North Korea for entering that country without a travel visa. Carter returned to the United States with Gomes.
- Bill Clinton travelled to North Korea in August 2009 to secure the release of two American journalists, Euna Lee and Laura Ling, who were imprisoned for illegally entering North Korea. He met with Kim Jong-il in Pyongyang, and returned to the United States with the journalists.

== See also ==
- Foreign policy of the United States
- United States–South Korea free trade agreement
- Security Treaty Between the United States and Japan
- One-China policy
