= Symbols of leadership =

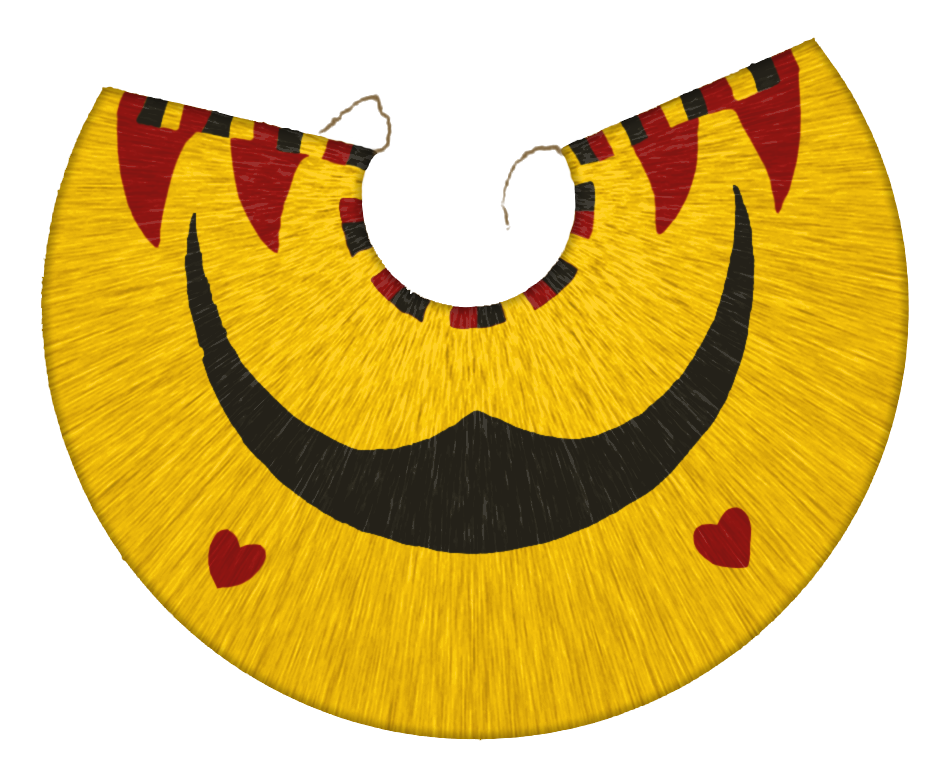
A feather cloak (ʻahu ʻula) which was a symbol of rank in Hawaii

Leadership cadres use symbols to reinforce their position power and provide a level of differentiation. Clothing frequently articulates rank or privilege, but accessories and external entities of varying functionality may also serve to mark out leaders - from finger rings to personal aircraft.

== Presidential symbols ==
Presidential symbols include many various insignia or other devices to denote a president's position. Some symbols follow accepted constitutional or diplomatic standards: flags, sashes, entrance Marches or a medallion or necklace. The use of the symbols mostly occurs for domestic purposes.

Examples of such symbols include the American presidential march "Hail to the Chief", and the presidential sashes worn by the presidents of Latin America nations. More practical, semi-symbolic features also abound: bodyguards may lurk semi-overtly; a head of state may use a special aircraft (see for example Air Force One).

== Royal/Imperial symbols ==
Ruling dynasties often exploit pomp and ceremony with the use of regalia: crowns, robes, orb and sceptres, some of which are reflections of formerly practical objects. The use of language mechanisms also support this differentiation with subjects talking of "the crown" and/or of "the throne" rather than referring directly to personal names and items.

Monarchies provide the most explicit demonstration of tools to strengthen the elevation of leaders. Thrones sit high on daises leading to subjects lifting their gaze (if they have permission) to contemplate the ruler. Architecture in general can set leaders apart: note the symbolism inherent in the very name of the Chinese imperial Forbidden City.

The culture and legends about the ruling family may build on myths of divine-right and describe the ruler or the Son of Heaven.

Court ceremonial highlights symbolic distance between a royal/imperial leader and follower, in a hierarchical system which cultivates a social system and power network at whose centre is the monarch. Bowing and curtseying remain as examples of the self-abasement of hand-sucking, bowing and scraping, prostration, kowtowing and proskynesis formerly demanded.

Sometimes colour plays a special role in advertising monarchical status: thus the once very rare pink/maroon dye color became a symbol reserved for imperial clothing - see purple.

Archaic touches often symbolically recall a glorious historical past: thus horse-drawn carriages replace everyday motor-vehicles for royal state occasions, and courtiers and flunkeys in elaborate dress grant a sense of ancient distance. And monarchs emphasize the remaining traces of their divine right to rule when undergoing anointing at the hands of the Church during coronation ceremonies.

== Socio-political leadership symbols ==
Overlapping with and/or emulating royalty, a ruling class or an aristocracy can devote much of its energy into "keeping up appearances" and emphasizing the purity of noble blood by apartness. Symbolism can aid this process cheaply. A coat-of-arms (perhaps in the form of a banner or on note-paper) or the wearing of a sword can incur less expense than maintaining a stately home. The visible presence of servants or slaves reminds underlings of social distance. Patronage, especially of fashion, provides one of the most symbolic attributes of social leaders or would-be leaders. Compare conspicuous consumption.

== Military leadership symbols ==
Apart from more elaborate uniform and their distinguishing marks (epaulettes, caps, medals), senior military officers may traditionally carry a baton or affect a similar substitute (such as a swagger stick or cane). Compare staff of office.

Banners, pennants and guidons serve (or served in the past) to identify leaders as rallying-points or field command-posts. Traces of these continue on staff cars or on naval ships, for example: see broad pennant and compare the concept and origin of a flagship.

== Ecclesiastical leadership symbols ==
Religious dignitaries often use vestments to emphasize the overall sacred nature of their organization. But some touches identify leaders and make them more imposing: a bishop's mitre, for example, a cardinal's red hat, a papal tiara or a papal ring. Less flamboyant faiths may use subtler symbolism to set religious leadership, holiness or saintliness apart: the understated dark vestments of the Protestant clergyman, the relatively unobtrusive clerical collar, or even the nakedness of a stereotypical Hindu ascetic fakir.

== Gender-related leadership symbols ==
Ownership of a harem has both practical and symbolic uses for leaders in traditional polygamous societies: harems spread genes and symbolically demonstrate wealth and status. Within such harems whole systems of symbolism may develop: the use of exclusive and inaccessible apartness, veiling, and the employment of eunuchs. Cultures which practise serial monogamy feature harem-analogous symbolism in the flaunting of trophy wives.

Items such as codpieces may suggest the assumed superiority of one gender-role over another: or symbolic leadership (implied by implied potency) within patriarchal structures. A slightly less extreme example, but one more common in modern times, expresses power relationships (and thus leadership symbolism) through the use of the phrase "wearing the trousers".

Ancient Egyptian pharaohs used a stylised artificial labdanum-soaked goats-hair beard as one of the regalia of rulership: a clear case of associating a male attribute with leadership.

== Symbols of leadership in offices ==
The suit continues to mark out the managerial class (which pretends to leadership functions) as a whole from ordinary blue-collar or non-suited workers. Suits stand at the apex of a system of dress code details: international standard business attire, with largely symbolic associations; see for example:

- Collar (clothing)
- Business casual
- Necktie
- White-collar worker

At the top levels of a bureaucratic organisation, senior leaders often attempt to merge the practical with the symbolic, making the perks of office appear functional: they may claim larger cars, smaller computers, an entrance guarded by a (non-digital) personal assistant, a large but uncluttered desk and (especially) a "corner office" with an aesthetically uplifting view.
