= Resignation services =

Service offered by companies to resign from a company on someone's behalf

Resignation services (退職代行サービス, Taishoku daikō sābisu) is a type of service offered by Japanese companies that communicate employees' resignation plans to their employers. The service is used to avoid trouble with resigning. Use of resignation services has increased since 2017, and companies have increased wages along with other benefits to prevent the loss of human resources. Debates about whether resignation services carried out by non-lawyers are illegal or not have occurred before, although the boundaries of the Lawyer's Act is not clearly defined.

== Description ==
A typical user hires the service to inform his company of his intent to resign. Some service providers offer assisted resignation within a day for limited cases, although a two weeks' notice is usually sent instead. The service is used the most by younger generations, with 60% of users in their 20s or 30s. Using the service can cost up to 50,000 yen.

The service is commonly used to avoid trouble resigning, such as companies refusing to let employees quit. Mental health problems and lack of motivation after long vacations like the Golden Week are also some of the reasons for using resignation services. Other reasons cited are harassments by bosses, pressures not to use paid leave, and large amounts of unpaid overtime. Some new graduates and employees use the service because the workplace did not provide what they promised, or differed from the promise.

Resignation services have existed since around the end of the 2000s in Japan, although they began to be recognized and be used among people after 2017. As of 2025, over 100 companies provide resignation services. Companies have increased wages and other benefits to prevent employees from resigning using resignation agencies.

== Problems and criticisms ==
Using the service damages the reputation of companies and employers, as workers may label them as a black company based on statistics.

Some people have criticized non-lawyers carrying out the services as a violation of article 72 of the Lawyers Act, as non-lawyers are banned from negotiating issues with laws on behalf of others in return for payment in Japan. Due to this, non-lawyers providing resignation services can only explain reasons for the employee resigning, answer questions by employers, and tell employers the user's intention to resign. Most resignation agencies cooperate with lawyers or trade unions to avoid legal risks. Albatross, one of the providers of this service, had their president arrested for charging customers to have an affiliated lawyer recommended.
