= Resignation speech =

Speech made by a public figure upon resigning from office

A resignation speech is a speech made by a public figure upon resigning from office.

Resigning speeches can have considerable political effect for a number of reasons:

- The resignation of a senior politician is normally an important, sometimes historic, event. As such, resignation speeches often command unusually high public interest and media attention;
- The exiting politician can take this opportunity to enumerate reasons for their resignation and perhaps to defend their reputation (see Richard M Nixon's 1974 speech below);
- Resigning public figures, particularly politicians, are freed from the constraints of cabinet collective responsibility and constitutional protocol and can voice their opinions with greater independence, for these or other reasons (see the opening paragraph of King Edward VIII's 1936 abdication speech below);
- The circumstances of a resignation often cast light on the activities or policies of an incumbent government. A resigning minister can cause significant political damage to an administration or to an individual colleague (see Geoffrey Howe's 1990 speech below).

== Notable resignation speeches ==
- 1846 - UK Prime Minister Sir Robert Peel resigns following the repeal of the Corn Laws. Extracts from this speech.
- 1936 - King Edward VIII abdicates the throne of the United Kingdom amidst controversy over his choice of partner. Text of the speech (in PDF).
- 1974 - US President Richard Nixon's televised speech from the Oval Office in which he announced his resignation following the Watergate scandal. Text of the speech.
- 1990 - UK Deputy Prime Minister Geoffrey Howe's speech to the House of Commons which in part led to the Conservative Party leadership election which removed Prime Minister Margaret Thatcher from office. Text of the speech.
- 1995 - British Prime Minister John Major resigns as Leader of the Conservative Party in order to contest a leadership election with the aim of silencing his internal critics and reasserting his authority. In his speech he famously told his opponents within to 'put up or shut up'. The gambit paid off, and Major was re-elected. Text of this speech.
- 1999 - President of Russia Boris Yeltsin announces his unexpected resignation on 31 December 1999, to the world's surprise. Text of this speech.
- 2003 - Former UK Foreign Secretary Robin Cook's speech to the House of Commons resigning as Leader of the House, and attacking the Blair government's decision to go to war in Iraq. Text of this speech.
- 2003 - British Secretary of State for International Development Clare Short, resigning over Government policy on Iraq. Text of this speech.
- 2003 - Chairman of the BBC Gavyn Davies, resigning following the findings of the Hutton Inquiry into the BBC's reporting of the death of Dr David Kelly. Text of this statement.
- 2010 - UK Prime Minister Gordon Brown resigns from office after he led his Labour Party to its worst electoral defeat in 27 years, despite no party winning an overall majority in the 2010 General Election. Constitutionally, this gave him the option to remain as Prime Minister until a new government could be formed, however, it soon became clear that the Liberal Democrats were instead going to form a coalition government with the Conservative Party. This resignation proved significant as it brought to an end 13 years of 'New Labour' government Text of speech.
