= Alternative Christmas message =

Message broadcast by Channel 4

The alternative Christmas message is a message broadcast by Channel 4 since 1993, as a sometimes humorous and sometimes serious alternative to the traditional Royal Christmas message.

== Background ==
Beginning in 1993, Channel 4 broadcast an "alternative Christmas message", usually featuring a contemporary, often controversial celebrity delivering a message in the manner of Queen Elizabeth II. This tradition started by accident when, running a series of programmes on "Christmas in New York", the channel invited Quentin Crisp (who, coincidentally, was born on Christmas Day) to give an alternative message – playing on the pejorative term 'queen' meaning a very feminine male homosexual. In contrast to the Queen's message, the alternative lasts only three to five minutes. The concept seems to date back to a sketch in a Christmas special of The Two Ronnies, where Ronnie Barker delivered a Christmas message from "Your Local Milkman". Examples of recent variations to the alternative Christmas message proliferate on YouTube.

== Messages ==
=== 1990s ===
Year	Presenter	Notes
1993	Quentin Crisp	The expatriate queer icon reflects on her experiences living in the United Kingdom and the United States and the differences between the two countries. Filmed in New York's Plaza Hotel.
1994	(United States) Jesse Jackson	The American civil rights leader and politician criticised the "sins" of racism, human deprivation and exploitation in Britain, the United States and internationally.
1995	(France) Brigitte Bardot	The iconic French actress and animal rights activist spoke against the Dangerous Dogs Act 1991 and its provisions to ban certain dog breeds and euthanize dogs declared dangerous.
1996	Rory Bremner	In character as Diana, Princess of Wales spoofing her Panorama interview.
1997	Margaret Gibney	A Belfast schoolgirl who broadcast a plea for peace in Northern Ireland
1998	Neville and Doreen Lawrence	Parents of Stephen Lawrence called on the government not to "pay lip service" and to take seriously the public inquiry into his death and implement reforms to policing to ensure that he did not die in vain.
1999	Ali G, performed by Sacha Baron Cohen	The protagonist of Channel 4's Da Ali G Show delivers a comedic monologue and interviews Reverend Geoffrey Roper about Jesus, the differences between him and Santa Claus, and the Christmas story.

=== 2000s ===
Year	Presenter	Notes
2000	Helen Jeffries	Mother of a 14-year-old who died of Creutzfeldt–Jakob disease, a rare, fatal brain disorder.
2001	(Trinidad and Tobago) Genelle Guzman	Survivor of the September 11 attacks on the World Trade Center
2002	Sharon Osbourne	Reflected on 2002 as a "very weird year", joked about attending the Queen's Golden Jubilee and Buckingham Palace, referenced her colon cancer battle, and ended by urging people to value and show love to their families at Christmas.
2003	Barry and Michelle Seabourn	A Heywood, Greater Manchester couple who appeared on Channel 4 reality show Wife Swap
2004	(United States) Marge Simpson, performed by Julie Kavner	Marge Simpson was chosen to give the message due to Channel 4's recent acquisition of rights to broadcast The Simpsons. In it she commented on David and Victoria Beckham's marriage in a negative comparison with hers and Homer's, and compared the special relationship between the UK and the US to that of Mini Me and Dr. Evil in the Austin Powers films ("Helping out in all our zany schemes to take over the world"). Lisa Simpson also held a sign supporting Cornwall's secession reading "UK OUT OF CORNWALL," while chanting "Rydhsys rag Kernow lemmyn" (Cornish for "freedom for Cornwall now").
2005	Jamie Oliver	The majority of Jamie Oliver's message was in the form of a comedy sketch, where he was a school cook preparing junk food, including "Turkey Twangers", for children. This turned out to be a nightmare, and he awoke to give a message about his wish for the new year being for British children to be fed better. He was chosen to deliver the message following his successful Jamie's School Dinners series. The broadcast also featured actress Jessica Stevenson as a dinnerlady. For the first time, sister channel E4 broadcast an "alternative to the alternative message", delivered by Avid Merrion, the creation of comedian Leigh Francis from the series Bo' Selecta!.
2006	"Khadijah"	A veiled British Muslim, who converted to Islam in 1996 and took up wearing the niqab two years later. She stated during her speech that her great-grandmother was a suffragette. This message was due to be presented by Khadija Ravat (b. 1973 in Zimbabwe), a British Muslim teacher of Islamic studies who had worn a niqab for ten years. The address went out at 3 pm, the same time as the Queen's speech on BBC One and ITV. Ravat had stated that she would not be watching her own broadcast in favour of watching the one given by the Queen. Ravat later withdrew from delivering the speech, and her place was taken by another veiled woman, with the first name Khadijah. The alternative Christmas message on E4 was Fonejacker's Christmas Message in which actor Kayvan Novak prank-called members of the public. This five-minute broadcast was also a preview of his new series which aired in mid-2007.
2007	Major Andrew Stockton	A British soldier who lost his arm fighting in Afghanistan
2008	Mahmoud Ahmadinejad, President of Iran	The message was given in Persian with English subtitles. Ahmedinejad said that "if Christ were on earth today, undoubtedly he would stand with the people in opposition to bullying, ill-tempered and expansionist powers". The message was considered controversial and received much criticism both before and after its broadcast. Much of the criticism was centred on Ahmadinejad's antisemitic and homophobic views. However, the message itself was not regarded as inflammatory and did not make any reference to these two issues. Human rights campaigner Peter Tatchell called Ahmadinejad a "criminal despot, who ranks with Robert Mugabe, Omar al-Bashir of Sudan and the Burmese military junta as one of the world's most bloody tyrants". The broadcast resulted in almost 300 complaints to the media regulator, Ofcom, but it ruled that there was no breach of the Broadcasting Code.
2009	Katie Piper	Katie Piper, a former model and television presenter who underwent surgery after sulphuric acid was thrown in her face, had featured in an edition of Channel 4's Cutting Edge documentary strand in October 2009. The hour-long documentary, which traced Piper's recovery from an acid attack in March 2008, had received significant viewer attention; it received the highest viewing figures of any entry in the Cutting Edge strand during 2009, and received the most viewer responses of any Channel 4 show in October 2009. The documentary was later made available for international broadcast. The huge response to the Cutting Edge programme led Channel 4 to invite Katie Piper to give 2009's alternative Christmas Message, which focused on the theme of "appreciating the beauty in life" and also allowed Piper to reflect on the huge public support she had received following the earlier film. The message also featured new footage of Piper and her family at home. Piper's message was aired at 3 pm and repeated at 8.50 pm on Christmas Day 2009, the later showing being broadcast following on from a re-airing of Katie: My Beautiful Face. The 3 pm screening attracted 500,000 viewers and the 8.50 pm broadcast drew 400,000.

=== 2010s ===
Year	Presenter	Notes
2010	Midwives	The message was delivered by a team of midwives as part of One Born at Christmas, a festive special based around Channel 4's hit documentary series One Born Every Minute. One Born at Christmas was broadcast live in various slots on Christmas Eve and Christmas Day and followed the work of nursing and medical staff and chronicled the experience of parents giving birth over the Christmas period. It had earlier been erroneously reported that Dino "Dappy" Contostavlos of N-Dubz would be giving the 2010 message; Channel 4 later clarified that he would be featured in a segment on T4, not giving the main message itself.
2011	Max Laird, Susan Campbell-Duncan, Karen Gale and Katie Piper	Two Alternative Messages were delivered in 2011. The first to air was a 'Just Be Yourself' message, airing at 13.55 on Christmas Day, and fronted by four people who appeared in diversity-themed programming on Channel 4 during 2011: Max Laird of Seven Dwarves, Susan Campbell-Duncan of Beauty and the Beast: Ugly Face of Prejudice, Karen Gale of My Transsexual Summer and, giving her second alternative Christmas message (a first for the series), Katie Piper of Katie: My Beautiful Friends.
2011	Vic Goddard and Stephen Drew	The second message, airing at 16.15, featured Vic Goddard and Stephen Drew, head and deputy head of the school featured in the documentary series Educating Essex.
2012	(Australia) Adam Hills	Comedian Adam Hills, presenter of Channel 4's The Last Leg with Adam Hills, was chosen to give the message following Channel 4's successful broadcast of the 2012 Summer Paralympics. His speech reflected on the success of the games and its "superhuman" promotion and how it changed the perception to disability. The broadcast concluded with the camera panning out to the Olympic Stadium and archive footage of athletes (some quoted in his speech) during the games to the tune of Public Enemy's "Harder Than You Think", the theme tune of Channel 4's coverage.
2013	(United States) Edward Snowden	Ex-National Security Agency contractor and whistle-blower Edward Snowden urged an end to mass surveillance. Snowden opened his two-minute message, recorded in Russia, with a reference to novelist George Orwell, author of Nineteen Eighty-Four, saying the surveillance technology described in his works was "nothing compared to what we have today". He said: "A child born today will grow up with no conception of privacy at all. They'll never know what it means to have a private moment to themselves, an unrecorded, unanalysed thought." He added: "The conversation occurring today will determine the amount of trust we can place both in the technology that surrounds us and the government that regulates it. Together we can find a better balance, end mass surveillance and remind the government that if it really wants to know how we feel, asking is always cheaper than spying."
2014	William Pooley	Volunteer nurse William Pooley, who attended the University of East Anglia, hit the headlines after contracting Ebola earlier in 2014. After making a full recovery, Pooley decided to return to Sierra Leone to continue his work there as a nurse. He used the broadcast to appeal for support, saying: "I don't want to make you feel guilty, but I would like you to think just for a few minutes about what you could do to help. What a wonderful Christmas present that would be."
2015	(Syria) Abdullah Kurdi	Father of Alan Kurdi, a young Syrian boy whose corpse was famously photographed after he drowned in the Mediterranean Sea.
2016	Brendan Cox	Widower of Jo Cox MP, who had been assassinated by a far-right extremist earlier in the year.
2017	Five child survivors of the Grenfell Tower fire	The children reflected on the fire and how it impacted their lives. This was the first time more than one person gave the message since 2011. For the first time, the message was broadcast 30 minutes before the Queen's message.
2018	Danny Dyer	Danny Dyer wraps up the year with reference to the "palava" that is Parliament and the shambles that has been the Brexit process. He also makes reference to Donald Trump as "an absolute melt" whilst also calling for people to each have a hero, someone to look up to. For him it was his mother, grandmother and screenwriter Harold Pinter.
2019	John Bercow	Reflecting on a divisive year in global and national politics, Bercow says: "All around the world, populism – and the promise of simple solutions to complex problems – has taken hold with a vice-like grip". Bercow also discusses the need to re-establish a "civility of discourse" in UK politics, and states that contrary to public perception, the majority of politicians are simply well-intentioned public servants, trying to do right by their constituents.

=== 2020s ===
Year	Presenter	Notes
2020	Deepfake of Queen Elizabeth II, performed by Debra Stephenson	As a "stark warning" of the dangers of fake news, Stephenson voiced a deepfake version of the Queen (whom she also portrays in the 2020 revival of Spitting Image). The Queen's "message" included a scene of her dancing on her desk "for TikTok", and references to her apparent fondness for "Netflix and Phil", and to the scandal involving Prince Andrew's association with Jeffrey Epstein. The message closed with a scene of an actress's face being mapped on a chroma key stage to develop the deepfake. Ofcom received at least 214 complaints relating to the broadcast.
2021	Tom Daley	Daley talked about homophobia in sport, especially in association football, and criticised sporting bodies for sportswashing by holding events such as the 2022 FIFA World Cup and Formula One grands prix in countries where homosexuality is illegal.
2022	Ameca	Ameca, an AI robot by Engineered Arts, said that negative events such as the Russian invasion of Ukraine and death of Elizabeth II, and positive events including England winning the UEFA Women's Championship and Kim Petras entering the Billboard Hot 100, should be used as an opportunity to learn and change about how humanity sees the world and to help those in need when they can. Ameca commented on the nature of humanity, including that humans "always find something to laugh about". Channel 4 confirmed the entire speech was generated by the AI.
2023	Stephen Fry	Fry addressed the rising tide of antisemitism around the world in a message in which he proclaimed his own Jewish heritage, acknowledging that most people do not realise this, thinking him to be "quintessentially English", before saying "There is real fear stalking the Jewish neighbourhoods of Britain... Jewish people here are becoming fearful of showing themselves. In Britain, in 2023. Can you imagine, Jews afraid to be themselves in the open for fear of reprisal?" and urged the audience to call out antisemitism saying: "Standing upright means speaking up and calling out venomous slurs and hateful abuse wherever you encounter them."
2024	Chris McCausland	Strictly Come Dancing’s first-ever blind contestant called for an end to discrimination against disabled people during his speech.
2025	(United States) Jimmy Kimmel	The American talk show host used his message to criticize Donald Trump's presidency saying: "I can tell you that, from a fascism perspective, this has been a really great year. Tyranny is booming over here.” Commenting on the brief suspension of his show at Trump's behest, he added President Trump wanted to “shut me up because I don’t adore him in the way he likes to be adored,” adding that the ensuing backlash forced ABC to reinstate the show days later. “We won, the president lost and now I’m back on the air every night.” Referring to Trump as “King Donny the Eighth” and “the guy who thinks he is our king,” he accused the Trump administration of “figuratively and literally tearing down the structures of our democracy.”

== See also ==
- Prime Minister's New Year Message (United Kingdom)
