= Chief Executive's Chinese New Year Message =

New Year address by the Chief Executive of Hong Kong

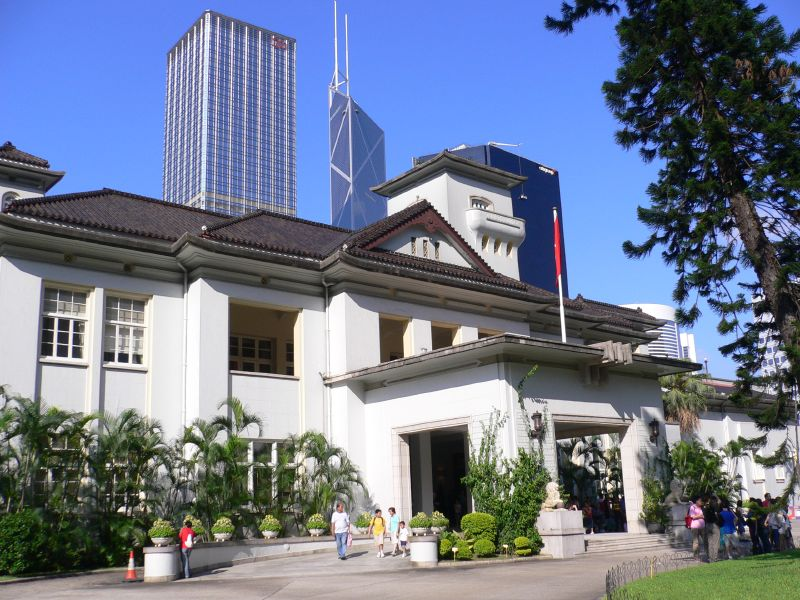
Government House, where the address is typically filmed

The Chief Executive's Chinese New Year Message (Chinese: 行政長官農曆新年賀辭), known as the Chief Executive's Lunar New Year Message before 2025 and the Governor's Lunar New Year Message (Chinese: 總督農曆新年賀辭) until 1997, is an annual address by the Chief Executive of Hong Kong typically released on Lunar New Year's Eve.

The format of the address has evolved somewhat over the years; the first messages consisted of a minutes-long videotaped speech of the Governor reflecting on the occasion while speaking directly into the camera, while messages today typically take the form of a one-minute video of the Chief Executive and their spouse taking part in the festivities, with a voiceover from the Chief Executive. The address is widely broadcast via radio and television.

== Messages by year ==
| Delivered by | New year | Zodiac | Message | Remarks |
|---|---|---|---|---|
| Edward Youde | 1985 | Ox | | |
| David Wilson | 1989 | Snake | | |
| David Wilson | 1991 | Goat | | |
| David Wilson | 1992 | Monkey | | |
| Chris Patten | 1993 | Rooster | The governor expressed that he was hopeful that arrangements for the 1995 elections to the Legislative Council would be clean, fair and acceptable. | |
| Chris Patten | 1994 | Dog | | |
| Chris Patten | 1995 | Pig | | |
| Chris Patten | 1996 | Rat | | |
| Chris Patten | 1997 | Ox | | Last message to be delivered by a governor |
| Tung Chee-hwa | 1997 | Ox | | Tung was still Chief Executive-elect |
| Tung Chee-hwa | 1998 | Tiger | | |
| Tung Chee-hwa | 1999 | Rabbit | | |
| Tung Chee-hwa | 2000 | Dragon | | |
| Tung Chee-hwa | 2001 | Snake | | |
| Tung Chee-hwa | 2002 | Horse | | |
| Tung Chee-hwa | 2003 | Goat | | |
| Tung Chee-hwa | 2004 | Monkey | | |
| Tung Chee-hwa | 2005 | Rooster | | |
| Donald Tsang | 2006 | Dog | | |
| Donald Tsang | 2007 | Pig | | |
| Donald Tsang | 2008 | Rat | | |
| Donald Tsang | 2009 | Ox | | |
| Donald Tsang | 2010 | Tiger | | |
| Donald Tsang | 2011 | Rabbit | | |
| Donald Tsang | 2012 | Dragon | | |
| Leung Chun-ying | 2013 | Snake | | |
| Leung Chun-ying | 2014 | Horse | | |
| Leung Chun-ying | 2015 | Goat | | |
| Leung Chun-ying | 2016 | Monkey | | |
| Leung Chun-ying | 2017 | Rooster | | |
| Carrie Lam | 2018 | Dog | | Had to be shot twice in light of the Tai Po bus crash |
| Carrie Lam | 2019 | Pig | | |
| Carrie Lam | 2020 | Rat | | |
| Carrie Lam | 2021 | Ox | | |
| Carrie Lam | 2022 | Tiger | Lam said Hong Kong had maintained stability with the help of the central government, and was on the right track in the implementation of one country, two systems. | |
| John Lee | 2023 | Rabbit | | |
| John Lee | 2024 | Dragon | | |
| John Lee | 2025 | Snake | Hong Kong will "innovate, reform and seek further development" and demonstrate its "agility and resilience" in the year of the snake. | First to be titled "Chinese New Year" |

== See also ==
- Prime Minister's New Year Message
- Policy Address
