= King George VI Memorial Chapel =

Chantry chapel, part of St George's Chapel at Windsor Castle, England

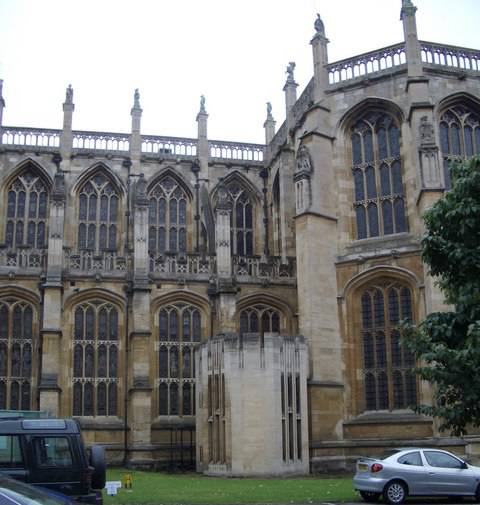
- The chapel abutting the exterior of St George's Chapel

- Location within Berkshire

Religion
- Affiliation: Church of England
- Year consecrated: 1969
- Known for: Burial place of George VI, Elizabeth II and their immediate family

Location
- Location: St George's Chapel, Windsor Castle
- Municipality: Windsor
- Country: England
- Coordinates: 51°29′01″N 00°36′25″W

Architecture
- Architects: George Pace; Paul E. Paget; Peter H. Field Philips
- Funded by: Elizabeth II
- General contractor: John Mowlem & Co. Ltd.
- Completed: 1969
- Construction cost: £25,000 £525,275 (2024 inflation adj.)

The King George VI Memorial Chapel is part of St George's Chapel at Windsor Castle in England. It was commissioned by Queen Elizabeth II in 1962 as a burial place for herself and her family, and was completed in 1969. It contains the final resting places of King George VI, Queen Elizabeth the Queen Mother, Queen Elizabeth II, Prince Philip, Duke of Edinburgh, and the ashes of Princess Margaret, Countess of Snowdon. The chapel was designed by George Pace.

== History ==
The chapel was commissioned by Queen Elizabeth II in 1962. The architects were instructed to design it to accommodate the remains of three monarchs and their consorts. In December 1962, her private secretary wrote to the Dean of Windsor, Robin Woods, with two requests. The first was that the Queen's eldest son, Prince Charles, be prepared for confirmation. The second was that a specific resting place be found for her father, King George VI. After his funeral service at St George's Chapel, George's remains had been placed in the royal vault beneath the chapel. His death had been unexpected, and no permanent resting place had been designated.

The Queen's request was not acted upon for another five years. She wished to spare her mother, Queen Elizabeth the Queen Mother, the distress of effectively burying her husband a second time. She also disliked the traditional marble chest tomb with life-sized effigies usually commissioned for monarchs, preferring simple floor slabs instead. There was no space for an additional vault within St George's Chapel, so the solution was the construction of a new chantry on its exterior. It was the first addition to St George's Chapel since the completion of the south-side chantry for Oliver King, private secretary to Henry VII in 1504.

== Design ==
The initial plan for the new chapel was rejected by the Royal Fine Arts Commission. It proposed a small rectangular chantry built into the north wall of the nave, designed by Paul Paget and John Seely, 2nd Baron Mottistone. A second design was then submitted and approved. It was prepared by the architect George Pace and involved constructing a chantry chapel between the Rutland Chapel and the north choir of St George's Chapel.

Pace's design is 18 feet (5.5 m) high, 10 feet (3.0 m) wide, and 14 feet (4.3 m) deep. The chapel was completed in 1969. It stands between two external buttresses of the north wall of the quire, and is built from Clipsham stone in Rutland. The red and blue stained-glass windows were designed by John Piper and made by Patrick Reyntiens. The roof is painted in black and white and decorated with embedded gold leaf.

The chapel contains an altar with a bronze relief portrait of George VI by Sir William Reid Dick. It is a replica of the portrait that hangs in St Mary Magdalene on the Sandringham estate in Norfolk. Robin Woods described the completed chapel as continuing "the perpendicular Gothic designs of the chapel itself, but in a twentieth century idiom".

An interment chamber lies directly beneath the chapel. It was commissioned specifically as a memorial to George VI and now serves as the burial place for several members of the British royal family, including Elizabeth II and Prince Philip, Duke of Edinburgh.

== Interments ==
=== King George VI (1969) ===
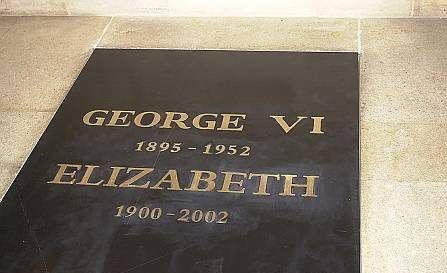
The former ledger stone naming George VI and Elizabeth in the memorial chapel, as it appeared before replacement after the interment of their daughter Elizabeth II and her husband Philip in September 2022

George's remains were transferred to the newly constructed memorial chapel, named in his honour, on 24 March 1969. The chapel was built at a cost of £25,000 (equivalent to £363,251 in 2025), funded entirely by Elizabeth II. It was dedicated on 31 March 1969 in a ceremony attended by George's widow, Queen Elizabeth the Queen Mother, and their daughter Queen Elizabeth II, with her husband Prince Philip, Duke of Edinburgh, and their eldest children, Prince Charles and Princess Anne. George's brother and former king, Edward VIII, was not invited. Louis Mountbatten, 1st Earl Mountbatten of Burma was absent due to his attendance at the funeral of the former President of the United States, Dwight D. Eisenhower. The ceremony was also attended by the Knights of the Garter.

The chapel is marked by wrought iron gates inscribed with the words "I said to the man who stood at the gate of the year: 'Give me a light that I may tread safely into the unknown'," from the 1908 poem "The Gate of the Year" by Minnie Louise Haskins. George VI notably quoted the lines in his Royal Christmas message of 1939.

=== Princess Margaret and Queen Elizabeth the Queen Mother (2002) ===
The ashes of George VI's younger daughter, Princess Margaret, Countess of Snowdon, were placed in the royal vault of St George's Chapel on 15 February 2002. Margaret was the first member of the British royal family to be cremated since Princess Louise, Duchess of Argyll, in 1939. She was cremated to ensure that her remains could be accommodated in the small interment chamber beneath the chapel. George's widow, Queen Elizabeth the Queen Mother, was interred beneath the chapel on 9 April 2002 following her funeral at Westminster Abbey. Margaret's ashes were placed in her parents' tomb at the same time.

With Margaret's royal monogram carved below the inscriptions, her tombstone is now placed separately in the right-hand corner of the chapel and reads:

In
thankful
remembrance
of
HER ROYAL
HIGHNESS
THE
PRINCESS
MARGARET
COUNTESS
OF
SNOWDON
BORN
21 AUGUST
1930
DIED
9 FEBRUARY
2002

Carved on the edges of Margaret's tombstone is an epitaph written by Margaret herself:

We thank thee Lord who by thy spirit doth our faith restore
When we with worldly things commune & prayerless close our door
We lose our precious gift divine to worship and adore
Then thou our Saviour, fill our hearts to love thee evermore

=== Queen Elizabeth II and Prince Philip (2022) ===
Elizabeth II was interred beneath the memorial chapel on 19 September 2022, in a private service attended only by members of the royal family, following her state funeral at Westminster Abbey earlier that day. Her husband, Philip, who died in 2021, had been placed in the royal vault of St George's Chapel after his funeral there. He was then interred beneath the King George VI Memorial Chapel alongside his wife.

After their interments, a replacement ledger stone was set into the chapel floor, with an additional metal star of the Order of the Garter between the couples' names. The ledger now reads:

GEORGE VI
1895–1952
ELIZABETH
1900–2002

ELIZABETH II
1926–2022
PHILIP
1921–2021
