= Chartered Institute of Personnel and Development =

UK professional association

CIPD
- Native name: Chartered Institute of Personnel and Development
- Type: Chartered, Not for Profit, Royal Charter
- Industry: Human Resources, L&D, Association and Awarding Body.
- Predecessor: Institute of Personnel and Development
- Founded: 1913
- Headquarters: Wimbledon, London, England, UK, United Kingdom
- Number of locations: CIPD UK, Asia, Middle East, Parts of Europe.
- Key people: Neil Carberry, Chief Executive, Rt Hon Chloe Smith, President
- Products: Certification, Accreditation, CPD HR and L&D training.
- Brands: People Management Magazine
- Services: HR and L&D
- Revenue: £37.3 million, 2018
- Total assets: 913,531 (2021)
- Members: 150000
- Number of employees: 390
- Website: www.cipd.co.uk

The Chartered Institute of Personnel and Development (CIPD) is an association for human resource management professionals. Its headquarters are in Wimbledon, London, England. The organisation was founded in 1913—it is the world's oldest association in its field and has over 160,000 members internationally working across private, public and voluntary sectors.

== History ==
=== Origins ===
In the United Kingdom, factory inspectors were appointed for the first time in 1893. In 1896 to look after its women and child workers Rowntree's appointed their first inspector - a Mrs E M Wood. Edward Cadbury of Cadbury Brothers in 1909 called together employers to discuss industrial welfare work and as a result 25 employers formed an association with Mrs Wood of Rowntree's as Secretary. The work of 'welfare workers' came to public attention during a trade show in 1912 at Olympia in London.

The forerunner of the CIPD, the Welfare Workers' Association (WWA) was formed at an employers' conference in York on 6 June 1913. The meeting was chaired by Seebohm Rowntree. Alongside his company, Rowntree's around fifty other companies were present including; Boots, Cadbury and Chivers and Sons. Thirty-four of the employers present decided that the WWA be founded as...an association of employers interested in industrial betterment and of welfare workers engaged by them. The outbreak of World War I in 1914 led to many women and children taking up the work of men, particularly in the larger munition factories where the appointment of welfare officers was made compulsory by legislation and was monitored by the Health of Munition Workers Committee. This led to the rapid expansion of female welfare workers. There were concerns about the training of welfare staff, and in 1917, at a gathering in Leeds of the seven welfare associations formed during the period it was agreed that they merge by forming the Central Association of Welfare Workers which to accommodate the regional associations established the beginnings of a local branch structure. The Association's position was also enhanced during the war years by nationally driven encouragement of workers to join trade unions to reduce the occurrence of industrial strife. Another development which increased the numbers of company staff dealing with labour and welfare matters occurred with the inclusion of managers, mainly men, from the North-western Area Industrial Association to assist with discipline, dismissal and industrial relations in increasingly unionised organisations. In 1918, to avoid confusion as to its purpose the Association changed its name to the Central Association of Welfare Workers (Industrial) (CAWWI).

Another important event which had a recurring impact on the activities of the CAWWI occurred in 1918 when the Rev. Robert Hyde founded the Boys’ Welfare Association soon after renamed the Industrial Welfare Society (IWS) with six employers who were concerned with the welfare of boys employed or apprenticed in the shipbuilding industry. From the outset there was a strained relationship between the two bodies which continued right through the inter-war period until resolved in 1946. Though both organisations were concerned with 'welfare at work' the CAWWI developed as an institution for practitioners and the IWS was established as a membership body for employers and there was strong disagreement on how best to bring about improvements in workplace conditions and workers' welfare. The IWS later became the Industrial Society and is now known as the Work Foundation.

=== The post—World War I period ===
In November 1919, following merger with welfare associations for men the Central Association of Welfare Workers (Industrial) was renamed the Welfare Workers' Institute and now had a membership of 700. However, the next five years saw a reduction in membership to 250 coinciding with the rapid collapse in industrial output as the government sought to reduce the national debt. Again in 1924 on incorporation the organisation changed its name to the Institute of Industrial Welfare Workers (IIWW). Minnie Louise Haskins, the author of the famous poem "The Gate of the Year" and a lecturer at LSE, was closely involved with the IIWW and edited its monthly bulletin. As a consequence of the activities of welfare workers during the General Strike of 1926 distrust in the welfare movement grew amongst trade unions which saw a new breed of 'labour managers' part of 'management' which was reflected in 1931 when the IIWW became the Institute of Labour Management and its magazine, rebranded Labour Management. Members of the institute experienced new demands during the 1930s. Firstly, economic growth resulted in a shortfall in skilled labour as companies competed to recruit workers. Secondly, this was followed by lay-offs and industrial action as a worldwide depression took hold, particularly in the industrially-focussed north of England. This influence also had the effect of increasing the number of male members of the institute which significantly shifted the gender balance of the membership. Thirdly, new human relations practices developed in the US were finding their way into more enlightened business which invested in their employees through training and provision of such things as salary benefits, pensions and paid holidays. In 1938 the first of the institute branches opened in the Republic of Ireland. In 1939 membership stood at 760. Mirroring the First World War during World War II, the government insisted on personnel officers to be deployed in factories engaged in war-related production.

=== The latter part of 20th century ===
Directly after the Second World War the incoming Labour government instigated a policy of industry nationalization and launched the National Health Service, further increasing the role of personnel professions in handling public sector recruitment, retention, payroll, training, and industrial relations issues. The enlightened practices of large American corporations, some of which had adopted the ideas of human relations thinkers, such as Elton Mayo, and the Civil Service in the field of personnel management were being taken up by the larger UK companies. Both influences were reflected in a further change of name in 1946 to the Institute of Personnel Management (IPM).

The 1950s were marked by government efforts to improve productivity both through introducing more modern management practices and increase labor supply through encouraging migration of people from the British Commonwealth also known as the Windrush generation. In 1955, responding to these changes, the IPM sought to increase the professional standards and standing of its members by introducing an externally moderated examination scheme, and restricting entry to full membership to fully qualified or practising personnel officers over age 35 with several years' experience. Membership in 1956 stood at 3,979.

During the 1960s, 1970s and 1980s influences on the UK workplace ranged from a series of technological revolutions, economic pressures from entry into the Common Market and impact of globalization, deregulation of the financial services industry (the Big Bang). Government intervention in industrial relations and the growth of health and safety, equality, collective and recruitment and employment legislation encouraged new specialisms to develop in the function. In some companies a shift was seen from reactive personnel management processes towards what became known as strategic human resource management practices, or in shorthand HRM. All these factors also influenced a steady increase in membership, which in 1987 was 31,400. The IPM underwent a period of contemplation during which it considered whether; to shift towards an HRM approach as its counterpart in the US the Society for Human Resource Management had already done, or to maintain its focus on the more traditional personnel management practices where the majority of its members still operated, or find a third way reflecting a more UK-focused approach. In 1994, a merger took place between the IPM and the Institute of Training and Development (ITD). The new organisation which had 70,000 members was named the Institute of Personnel and Development (IPD), sought to represent the range of professionals engaged in one or more elements of people management.

=== Chartered status ===
Chartered status was achieved in 2000 and the IPD was incorporated under Royal Charter from 1 July of that year to become known as the Chartered Institute of Personnel and Development (CIPD) and reported it had a membership of 120,000 practitioners. In June 2013 the CIPD commemorated its centenary year.

== CIPD membership ==
As of November 2019 the CIPD reported it had over 150,000 members working or studying in the UK and internationally. Following the re-designation of chartered and non-chartered membership status in 2010 the membership structure comprises:

=== Chartered grades ===
- Chartered Companion (CCIPD) By invitation only, awarded in recognition of contributions to the profession or the institute.
- Chartered Fellow (FCIPD) An upgrade from Chartered MCIPD, applicants must have at least 10 years' relevant experience. To achieve Chartered Fellow status, you'll need to demonstrate at least three years’ current experience working consistently at a senior level. The scope of your role will be strategic in nature, with an impact across many functions; you'll rarely work operationally.
- Chartered Member (MCIPD) Awarded on request to graduate members who have three years' relevant managerial experience. Or a non-graduate member assessed against the professional standards after five years' relevant experience (through Experience Assessment). To achieve Chartered Member status, you'll need to demonstrate at least three years’ current experience working consistently at this level. Your role may include elements of developing people strategy, but you'll also be operational, planning and managing HR activity.

=== Non-chartered grades ===
- Foundation (Foundation CIPD) This grade was introduced in 2021.
- Associate (Assoc CIPD) This Associate grade was introduced in 2010 and has since replaced the Licentiate grade in 2010 and Graduate level which was phased out in 2014. Associate membership is the first level of HR certification and professionalism in the HR/L&D field.
- Affiliate: a basic level of membership, not assessed against professional standards but relevant qualification and work experience is mandatory.
- Student Membership: normally undertaking a CIPD-approved Certificate or Diploma and have not had a higher membership level prior to that.

=== Academic memberships ===
To be eligible for Academic Membership of the CIPD you need to be an individual working in the field of teaching or research in HRM or an HRM related area.

=== Chartered grades ===
- Academic Member (Academic MCIPD) Typically an experienced lecturer, senior researcher, recognized in the UK or internationally as an expert in more than one relevant HR or L&D subject area.
- Academic Fellow (Academic FCIPD) Typically a senior academic or research leader, recognized in the UK or internationally as an expert in at least two areas of HR or L&D.

=== Non-chartered grades ===
- Academic Associate (Academic Assoc CIPD) Typically an experienced lecturer, tutor or researcher in an HR or L&D subject area.

== Accreditation ==
CIPD is also a training provider of professional HR and L&D qualification. As such, the non profit registered charity is incorporated with the Royal Charter and is listed as an awarding body and learning provider of professional qualification which is officially recognized by the government of United Kingdom's Ofqual, CCEA and Qualification Wales. This mean the CIPD qualifications are recognized nationally and internationally. This also gives CIPD accreditation powers to choose which universities meet their strict requirements for accreditation of undergraduate, postgraduate, MSC, HR and L&D programmes, which is highly sought out by UK and International universities.

== Research ==
On an annual basis the institute conducts regular surveys on reward management, employee expectations and attitudes to pay and benefits, resourcing and talent planning, and learning and development. The CIPD's 2015 research programme includes specific projects on; the behavioural sciences and learning, people management in small and medium-sized enterprises, social media and technology impacts in the workplace, leadership and management development, valuing the impact of an organisation's people on business performance, the 'megatrends' shaping the labour market and the future workplace. Periodic research reports are published for members on the results from surveys and the findings from research projects.

== Public policy ==
The CIPD contributes on public policy issues on behalf of its members by using its in-house research team and draws on the professional experience of its members to develop responses to public policy issues including government consultations. It researches and publishes surveys and responds to media enquiries on the range of human resource issues such as labour markets, reward and employment policy. Commentating on labour market economics and trends has become an increasingly important feature of the CIPD's services to members. The institute's chief economist (currently Mark Beatson) provides economic intelligence to members via CIPD publications and events and as its key spokesperson on labour market economic analysis and forecasting is involved in promoting the institute in the national and business media.

== Branches ==
The CIPD is represented at local level through its 52 branches in the United Kingdom, Republic of Ireland, Channel Islands, Isle of Man and Gibraltar. The branches provide learning and networking opportunities, events, information services, and membership and upgrading help for CIPD members and students.

== International activities ==
The CIPD runs a training programme for international HR practitioners and has links with European and World Federations of HR. The CIPD hosted the 2008 WFPMA World HR Congress.

Based in Dublin, CIPD Ireland has over 6,000 members spread in seven regional branches.

The Singapore Management University (SMU) has become the first university in Asia to offer a master's degree accredited by the Chartered Institute of Personnel and Development (CIPD). SMU joins prestigious universities such as the London School of Economics and Political Science (LSE) and King's College London to deliver the CIPD's premier level accredited qualifications.

The CIPD opened its first office in the Middle East in Dubai in 2016 to support its over 4,000 members in the region.

== Digital services ==
The CIPD website provides podcasts, an RSS news feed, blogs and a professional discussion forum.

== Commercial services ==
CIPD Enterprises Limited is the wholly owned subsidiary of the CIPD. Commercial services supplied by CIPD Enterprises include:

- CIPD Publishing
- CIPD Training
- CIPD Events
- People Management Jobs
- CIPD Asia
- CIPD Middle East

== Publications and events ==
- Haymarket Media Group publishes the HR journal People Management, on behalf of the Chartered Institute of Personnel and Development.
- Annual Conference and Exhibition: The CIPD holds its Annual Conference and Exhibition in Manchester, typically at Manchester Central during November
- The CIPD Festival of Work is held annually in London in June. From 2024, this will be held Excel London.

== See also ==
- List of human resource management associations
- Privy Council of the United Kingdom
- Royal charter
- Society for Human Resource Management (SHRM)
