= People Management =

British human resources publication

People Management (PM) is the UK's biggest human resources (HR) publication, with an average circulation of 134,853 (2015). It is the official magazine of the Chartered Institute of Personnel and Development (CIPD), and is published by Haymarket Media Group. People management is defined as a set of practices that encompass the end-to-end processes of talent acquisition, talent optimization, and talent retention while providing continued support for the business and guidance for the employees of an organization.

In 1996, it became the first magazine in the UK to refuse “ageist” recruitment advertisements, as the start of a campaign against age discrimination, which saw PM draw up a charter that was eventually signed by 65 recruitment communications and marketing businesses.

In addition to age discrimination, the magazine has worked to raise awareness of the employment issues facing employees with mental illness, ex-offenders, dyslexic people, women, ethnic minorities, people with disabilities, and gay, lesbian and bisexual workers. It has also highlighted best practice in managing and supporting employees with cancer. In 2006, it ran a successful campaign to draw attention to the issue of pregnancy at work, for which it joined forces with baby charity Tommy's.

Its website includes an HR jobs search and a supplier directory. In 2011, People Management changed from a fortnightly publication schedule to a monthly one. April 2011 was the first monthly issue to be published. In 2015, international editions of People Management were launched in the Middle East and Asia.

== Awards ==
- 2015: the April 2015 "Sex, drugs and crossbows" cover wins BSME business brand cover of the year
- 2015: People Management named 'HR publication of the year' at the annual Towers Watson awards
- 2013: People Management named 'Best for Membership (Not-for-profit/Charities/Associations)' at the International Content Marketing Awards
- 2011: People Management shortlisted for the Stonewall publication of the year award – the second time PM has made the shortlist
- 2007: PM editor Steve Crabb won editor of the year in the British Society of Magazine Editors (BSME) annual awards (business and professional non-weekly category); editor Susanne Lawrence had previously won it in 1993
- 2001: the magazine won the 'Media' award from Help the Aged in their NOJO awards for their campaigning work on age discrimination
- 1999 and 2000: PM won 'Most Effective Business-to-Business Title' and 'Website of the Year' in the APA Awards
- 1992: the magazine won overall best cover in the Magazine Publishing Awards (business category);
- 1992: PM journalist D. MacKenzie Davey won best regular columnist in the Magazine Publishing Awards (business category); editor Susanne Lawrence had won the award for best specialist columnist in 1983
- 1989: the magazine won best feature in the Magazine Publishing Awards (business magazine category)
- 1989 and 1980: PM journalist Jane Pickard won magazine industrial journalist of the year at the Industrial Society; editor Susanne Lawrence had previously won it in 1980
- 1988: the magazine won best use of illustration in the Magazine Publishing Awards, for an article on transvestism
- 1988: the magazine won best specialist columnist, for 'Computerfile', at the Magazine Publishing Awards (business category)

== Previous names ==
- Since 1995: People Management, incorporating Personnel Management, PM Plus, Training and Development, and Transition
- 1990–1995: PM Plus
- 1986–1990: IPM Digest
- 1969–1980: Personnel Management
- 1967–1969: Personnel
- 1947–1967: Personnel Management

== Editors ==
- 1970: Pam Pocock
- 1974: Susanne Lawrence
- 1994: Rob MacLachlan
- 1999: Steve Crabb
- 2008: Rob MacLachlan
- 2012: Robert Jeffery

== Publishing history ==
- October 2015: People Management Asia, and People Management Middle East are launched
- July 2012: Contract moves to Haymarket Media Group
- April 2011: People Management reverts to monthly frequency
- January 1995: People Management launched as a fortnightly publication to coincide with merger of IPM and Institute of Training and Development (ITD); new title incorporates Personnel Management, PM Plus, Training and Development and Transition
- July 1990: PM Plus launched as new mid-monthly edition of Personnel Management, replacing IPM's house journal IPM Digest
- 1981: Susanne Lawrence together with David Evans of Centurion Press set up new company, Personnel Publications Ltd (PPL), to produce Personnel Management for IPM; contract moves from Business Publications. First issue under PPL – July
- May 1969: Contract moves from Haymarket to Mercury House Business Publications Ltd (BPL). BPL's long-standing independent monthly Personnel and Training Management (formerly Personnel Management and Methods) becomes Personnel Management, monthly magazine of IPM. Editors – Anthony Barry, Pamela Pocock, Susanne Lawrence
- October 1967: IPM contracts magazine out to Haymarket Press; retitled Personnel
- 1947–67: Institute of Personnel Management (IPM) publishes own quarterly magazine called Personnel Management
