= Ameca (robot) =

Planned general purpose robotic humanoid by Engineered Arts Ltd

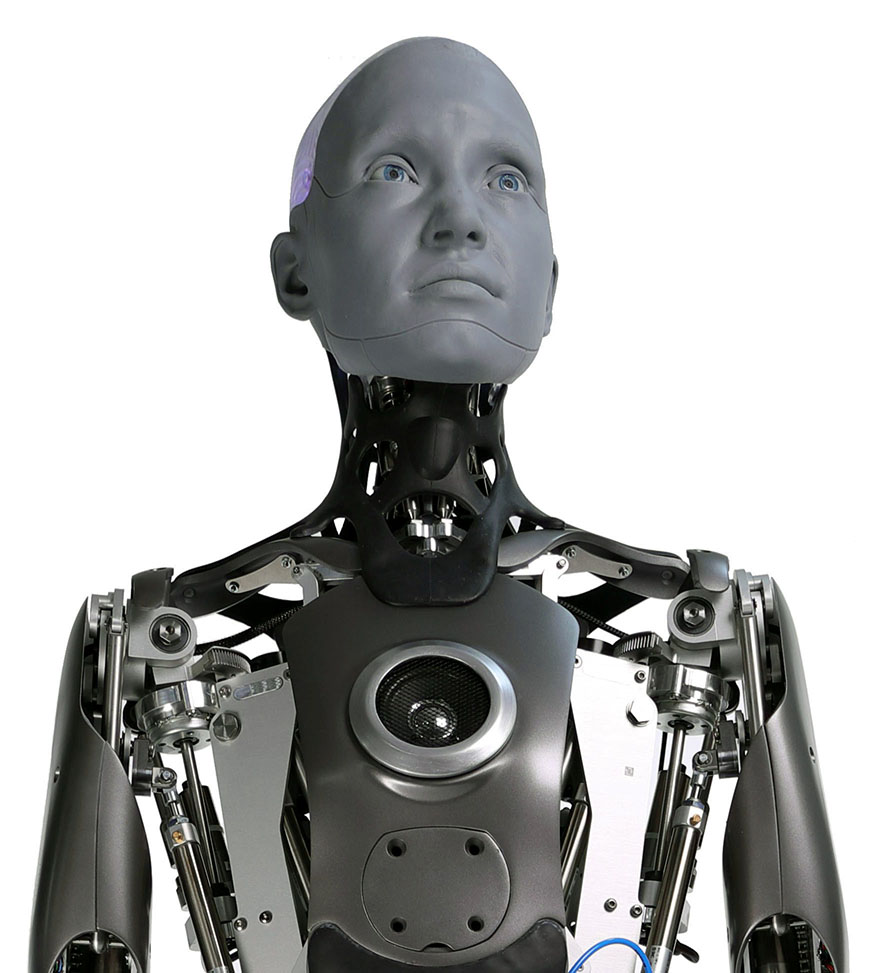
- Ameca Generation 1
- Manufacturer: Engineered Arts
- Year of creation: 2021; 5 years ago
- Type: Humanoid
- Purpose: Human interaction

Ameca is a robotic humanoid created in 2021 by Engineered Arts, headquartered in Falmouth, Cornwall, United Kingdom. The project commenced in February 2021, and the first public demonstration was at the CES 2022 show in Las Vegas. Ameca's appearance features grey rubber skin on the face and hands, and is specifically designed to appear genderless. The full size humanoid has powered arms for gesturing but is stationary.

Ameca Desktop generation 3, a head-and-torso variant, has been released and showcased at ICRA 2025, with three models available (Ameca, Ami and Azi).

== History ==
The first generation of Ameca was developed at Engineered Arts headquarters in Falmouth, Cornwall, United Kingdom. The project started in February 2021, with the first video revealed publicly on 1 December 2021. Ameca gained widespread attention on Twitter and TikTok ahead of its first public demonstration at the Consumer Electronics Show 2022, where it was covered by CNET and other news outlets.

In 2022, Ameca presented an Alternative Christmas message by British TV Channel 4 for Christmas Day. Ameca was associated with the Museum of the Future's robotic family, where it could interact with visitors. In 2024, an Ameca unit was installed in Edinburgh in the UK to reside at the National Robotarium. In January 2026, Ameca served as an ambassador for the European Space Agency (ESA) at the 18th European Space Conference. Later that year, Ameca was featured on Muse's European tour for The Wow! Signal album, performing live vocals on a remixed version of their track "Kill or Be Killed" as well as an updated version of the "[Drill Sergeant]" intro to their song "Psycho".

== Features ==
It is designed as a platform for further developing robotics technologies involving human-robot interaction. Ameca utilizes embedded microphones, binocular eye mounted cameras, a chest camera (desktop version only) and facial recognition software to interact with the public. Interactions can be governed by OpenAI's GPT-6 or human telepresence. The full size humanoid also features articulated motorized arms, fingers, neck and facial features.

Ameca's appearance features grey rubber skin on the face and hands, and is specifically designed to appear genderless.

== Public appearance highlights ==
- Computer History Museum, California
- Heinz Nixdorf MuseumsForum, Paderborn, Germany
- Copernicus Science Center, Warsaw, Poland
- Museum of the Future, Dubai
- Consumer Electronics Show 2022
- Deutsches Museum Nuremberg
- OMR Festival 2022 Hosted by Vodafone
- GITEX 2022
- International Conference on Robotics and Automation 2023
- International Telecommunication Union AI for Good Global Summit 2023
- Sphere (Not Ameca, Custom humanoid named Aura built on Ameca technology)
- Muse – The Wow! Signal Tour (2026)
