= Florence Margaret Spencer Palmer =

British composer

Florence Margaret Spencer Palmer (27 July 1900 – 29 March 1987) was a British composer who wrote several hymns and a piano pedagogy textbook. She published some of her works under the name Peggy Spencer Palmer.

Spencer Palmer was the youngest of seven children born in Thornbury, Gloucestershire, to James and Amy Spencer Palmer. She was taught at home until age 10, when she attended school for five years. She then studied at the Royal Academy of Music, and earned a Bachelor of Music degree from the University of London. Her teachers included Sir Ivor Atkins, Benjamin Dale, Vivian Longrish, Mabel G. Smith, and Norman Sprankling.

Spencer Palmer worked as an accompanist and secretary to Mrs. Catherine Booth-Clibborn (Kate Booth), the daughter of Salvation Army founder William Booth. She later taught music at the following schools:

- 1929–1947: Clarendon School, Malvern, Worcestershire
- 1948–1958: Redlands High School, Bristol
- 1959–1961 St. Brandon's School, Clevedon.

In 1923, Spencer Palmer received the Chappell Medal music award. She later won the Horatio Albert Lumb award for hymns and anthems. She was confirmed in the Church of England, and her compositions appeared in the Anglican Hymn Book. She arranged work by other composers, including Wings, a collection of songs by Amy Carmichael. Her works were published by Ascherberg Hopwood & Crew and Cramer & Co.

Three of her cello pieces - Legend, Sarabande and Bagatelle - have been recorded by Catherine Wilmers and Jill Morton.

== Published works ==
Her publications included:

Book

- Simplified Sight Reading

Chamber music

- Three Pieces (cello and piano)

Piano

- A Pianist's Book of Chimes
- Burlesque
- Three Festive Pieces
- Variations on Barbara Allen

Vocal

- Brynland
- Duplock
- Ellasgarth
- Except the Lord Build the House (motet; text based on Psalm 127)
- Gate of the Year(text by Minnie Louise Haskins)
- Like as a Father (text based on Psalm 103)
- Nativity
- O Love that Wilt Not Let Me Go (text by George Matheson)
