= Minnie Louise Haskins =

British poet and academic (1875–1957)

- Haskins in later life
- Born: 12 May 1875; Oldland, Gloucestershire, England
- Died: 3 February 1957 (aged 81); Royal Tunbridge Wells, Kent, England
- Citizenship: British
- Occupations: Poet and academic
- Writing career
- Notable work: The Gate of the Year

Minnie Louise Haskins (12 May 1875 – 3 February 1957) was a British poet and an academic in the field of sociology, best known for being quoted by King George VI in his Royal Christmas Message of 1939.

== Early life ==
Haskins was born at 2 Kingswood Hill, Oldland, South Gloucestershire, 6 miles (10 km) east of Bristol, and she grew up in the neighbouring village of Warmley. Her father was Joseph Haskins, a grocer, and her mother was Louisa Bridges. Her father acquired a pottery at Warmley making drain pipes, which was continued after his death by her mother. The family lived at Warmley House.

She was a Congregationalist and she taught Sunday School for many years. She studied informally at University College, Bristol while undertaking voluntary work for her local church. By 1903, she was working in Lambeth, London, for the Springfield Hall Wesleyan Methodist Mission. In 1907, she departed for Madras, India with the Wesleyan Methodist Missionary Society to work in one of the Zenana missions to women. In 1912, to raise funds, Haskins published a small volume of poetry The Desert, which included the poem "God Knows", originally written in 1908, to which she added the famous preamble to create the poem that today is commonly known as "The Gate of the Year".

In 1915, poor health led Haskins, now 40 years old, to return to England where she ran a munitions workers' hostel in Woolwich for six months. This was followed by three years supervising the labour management department of a government-controlled munitions factory in Silvertown, West Ham, an industrial area of East London. Somehow she found time to publish a second volume of poetry, The Potter, in 1918.

== Academic career and later life ==
At the age of 43, Haskins came to the London School of Economics (LSE) to study for the Social Science Certificate under Agatha Harrison, who had been appointed in 1917 to the first British academic post devoted to industrial welfare. After gaining the Certificate with distinction in 1919, she took the Diploma in Sociology, gaining a further distinction in 1920. From 1919 to 1939 she worked as a tutor in the Social Science Department where the senior tutor described her as: "a woman of unusual capacity and character … a rare understanding and sympathy and infinite patience, combined with a great deal of love and interest in people."

In 1921 she published with Eleanor T. Kelly Foundations of Industrial Welfare promoting "a spirit of co-operation" between worker and employer. Haskins was closely involved with the establishment in 1924 of the Institute of Industrial Welfare Workers, the successor to the Welfare Workers' Institute and the precursor to what is now the Chartered Institute of Personnel and Development (CIPP). The CIPP is the world's oldest association in its field. During this time, Haskins wrote two novels Through Beds of Stone (1928) and A Few People (1932) and a further volume of poetry Smoking Flax (1942).

Although she retired in 1939, Haskins soon returned to LSE to teach at the outbreak of Second World War. She finally retired in 1944 at the age of 69. She died just over twelve years later at Kent and Sussex Hospital, Royal Tunbridge Wells, on 3 February 1957. She was 81 years old. She never married.

== The Gate of the Year ==
Although it was widely believed that Queen Elizabeth made her husband George VI aware of the poem, the book The Servant Queen and the King She Serves published in 2016 for Queen Elizabeth II's 90th birthday, its foreword being by that monarch, says that it was the young Princess Elizabeth herself, aged 13, who handed the poem to her father.

The King did not name the author of the poem, but on Boxing Day (the day after Christmas) the BBC announced that the author was Minnie Louise Haskins. Haskins, by then 64 years old, had not known beforehand that the King would quote her words, and did not hear the broadcast. On the next day, she was interviewed by The Daily Telegraph and said: "I heard the quotation read in a summary of the speech. I thought the words sounded familiar and suddenly it dawned on me that they were out of my little book."

The opening words of the poem "The Gate of the Year" struck a chord with a country facing the uncertainty of war. It is now among the most quoted poetic works of the twentieth century. This poem is inscribed at the entrance to the King George VI Memorial Chapel in St George's Chapel, Windsor at Windsor Castle, and in a window at the Savoy Chapel in London. The poem was read at the funeral of Queen Elizabeth the Queen Mother in 2002 and was printed in the Order of Service.

The poem was included in the closing moments of the 1940 Metro-Goldwyn-Mayer/Frank Borzage film The Mortal Storm, starring Margaret Sullavan, James Stewart and Robert Young.

The poem and her life story were featured in the BBC Radio 4 programme Adventures in Poetry on 19 and 25 December 2010. In December 2015 she was featured in the BBC One television documentary Cue the Queen: Celebrating the Christmas Speech.

The poem has been set to music by Canadian composer Eleanor Joanne Daley and British composer Florence Margaret Spencer Palmer.

== Nationality ==
Haskins was English and a British citizen, yet various sources have erroneously reported that she was either American or Canadian.

== Publications ==
- The Desert. London: privately printed, 1912.
- The Potter. London: Erskine Macdonald Ltd, 1918.
- "Foundations in Industrial Welfare." With Eleanor T. Kelly. Economica vol. 1 (May 1921): 116–131.
- Through Beds of Stone. London: Macmillan, 1928.
- A Few People. London: Lovat Dickson Ltd, 1932.
- The Gate of the Year. London: Hodder and Stoughton, 1940.
- Smoking Flax. London: Hodder and Stoughton, 1942.
