= Beauty and the Beast: Ugly Face of Prejudice =

Documentary series

Beauty and the Beast: Ugly Face of Prejudice is a UK Channel 4 documentary series that investigates the extremes of discrimination against people with facial disfigurement. The series ran from 2011 to 2012.

Consisting of six episodes, series one was shown in 2011. The series returned for a second season of 4 episodes in 2012.
