= Netflix and chill =

Internet slang term for sexual activity

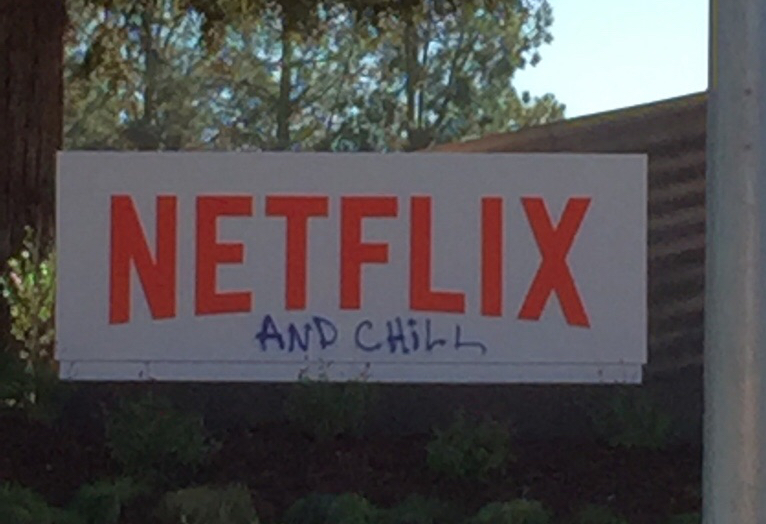
The graffitied sign in front of Netflix's headquarters in Los Gatos, California

"Netflix and chill" is a phrase originally meaning to stay home and watch entertainment programs via a streaming platform. It has gained an additional usage as an Internet slang term or euphemism for sexual activity, either as part of a romantic partnership, as casual sex, or as a groupie invitation. Since its first known recorded, nonsexual use in a tweet posted in 2009, the phrase has gained popularity within the Twitter community and other social media sites like Facebook and Vine. By 2015, "Netflix and chill" became increasingly used as an Internet meme and its use on teenage social media was commonly described as "sexual" by Fusion. The phrase can be used in its literal, original meaning or as a request to be in one another's company and then engaging in sexual activity.

== History ==
=== Origins ===
NoFaceNina
(@nofacenina)
tweeted:

I'm about to log onto Netflix and chill for the rest of the night.

21 January 2009

The first recorded use of the phrase "Netflix and chill" was in a Twitter post by "NoFaceNina" (La Shanda Rene Foster) on January 21, 2009. It said: "I'm about to log onto Netflix and chill for the rest of the night." Early use of the phrase was without sexual connotations, referring simply to the act of watching the online streaming service, typically by oneself. By 2013, Netflix's popularity in the US had risen greatly, having accumulated millions of paid subscribers, increasing verb use of the brand and this phrase as a standalone compound noun.

The euphemistic nature of the phrase is believed to have been established in mid-2014, and by the end of the year had spread throughout the Black Twitter community, as seen by many now typing chill within scare quotes. In April 2015, a definition of the phrase was added to Urban Dictionary stating that it meant "code for two people going to each other's houses and fucking or doing other sexual related acts". Soon, the term would spread beyond the Black Twitter community, becoming an Internet meme and gaining the attention of news websites such as The Guardian and the Daily Mirror.

=== Impact ===
As the phrase entered into common lexicon, events, products, and services associated with the phrase started to emerge, including acknowledgement from Netflix itself.

In September 2015, a joke app in the style of Tinder had been created for users to organize "Netflix and chill" sessions. At two separate universities, students planned "Netflix and chill" festivals, with one being canceled by authorities as they believed too many people would be in attendance. During the 2015 World Maker Faire in New York City, Netflix unveiled a prototype for a large button called "The Switch", which, when pressed, will dim the lights in the users' residence, activate the "Do Not Disturb" feature on their cell phones, and prepare Netflix for streaming—eliminating most distractions from their activities. This has been frequently referred to as the "Netflix and chill button".

In October 2015, entrepreneur Kori Williams created and sold a line of condoms named Netflix and Chill.

In November 2015, the Netflix logo outside the company's headquarters in Los Gatos, California had been spray-painted to add the words "and chill".

In December 2015, Ariana Grande released the holiday EP Christmas & Chill, its title a seasonal variation on "Netflix and chill".

In January 2016, artist Tom Galle and company ART404 created a "Netflix & Chill Room" in New York City for rent on Airbnb.

In early February 2016, Netflix released the results of a survey on how users in relationships use their service, described as a "Netflix and chill study". The results were accompanied with a series of social media posts with the hashtag "#DatingWithNetflix" promoting the idea of a positive impact for couples using the service.

In June 2016, singer-songwriter Danah released a song titled "Netflix and Chill" on SoundCloud. The track was produced by Wippy Lion, a member of Australian pop group Justice Crew. The song is a tongue-in-cheek representation of the term's use in popular culture.

In January 2020, Ben & Jerry's announced a new ice cream flavor called "Netflix & Chilll'd".

"Netflix and chill" inspired the name Stream and Chill for the Danish radio talk-show about streaming and TV-series. Stream and Chill is a Radio4 original program with radiohost William Ejsing. Stream and Chill has been on air since 2019.

"RBB and chill" is a spoof of "Netflix and chill", used as a commercial slogan by the regional Public Service Broadcaster Rundfunk Berlin-Brandenburg in the north-east of Germany, mainly on billboards across the German capital of Berlin.

== See also ==
- Sexual innuendo
- Sexual slang
