= Engineered Arts =

Robotic design company based in Cornwall, England

Engineered Arts Ltd
- Industry: Humanoid robots
- Founded: 2004; 22 years ago
- Founder: Will Jackson
- Headquarters: Falmouth, Cornwall, England
- Website: engineeredarts.co.uk

Engineered Arts Ltd is an English engineering, designer and manufacturer of humanoid robots based in Cornwall, England. It was founded in October 2004 by Will Jackson.

== History ==
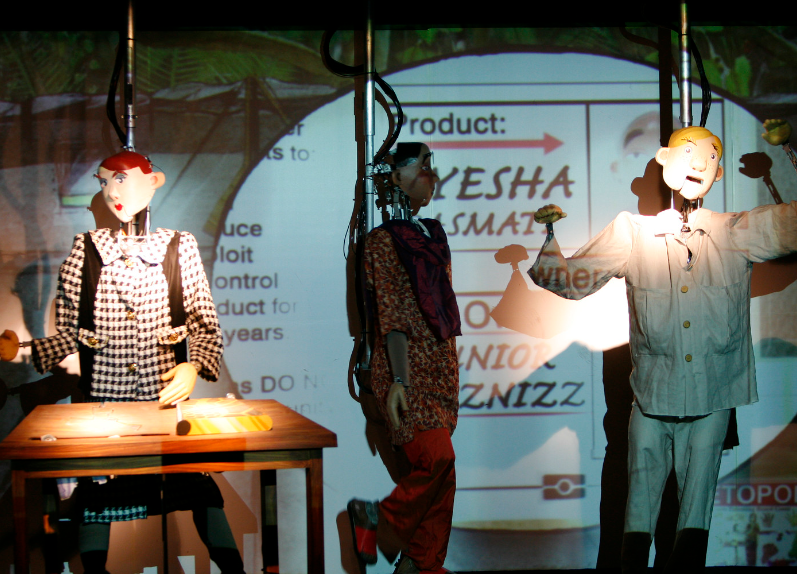
Three early versions of Robothespian performing in The Eden Project's "Mechanical Theater"

The company was founded by Will Jackson in 2004. While working on exhibitions for London's Science Museum in the 1990s, Jackson came upon the need for a machine that could explain concepts and ideas to people repetitively in an entertaining way and not to be nervous when talking to a group of people. In 2005, Jackson's work on the "Mechanical Theater" for The Eden Project would produce the company's first humanoid robot, RoboThespian Mark 1.

The company's early work included, creative and science education projects for Kew Gardens in London, Glasgow Science Centre in Scotland and other non-robot work. After completing the installation of a robot theatre at Copernicus Science Centre in 2010 the decision was made to focus solely on robot hardware and software.

== Products ==
=== Ameca ===
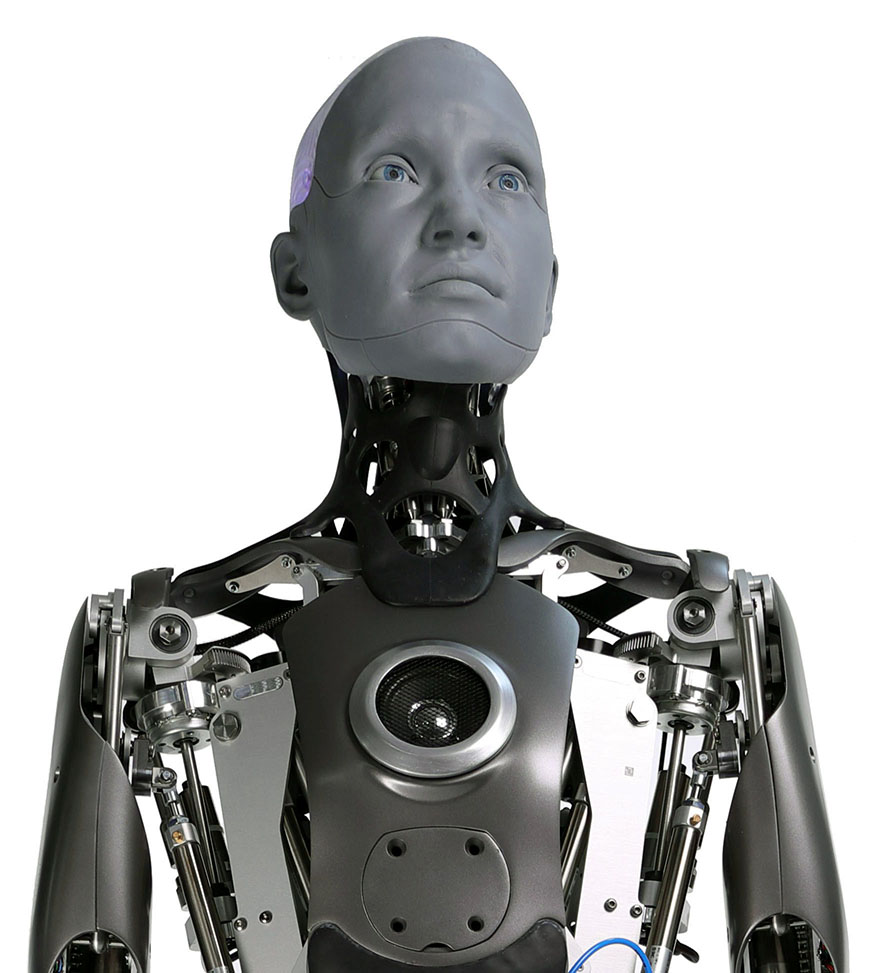
Ameca humanoid robot, generation 1

Ameca is a humanoid robot designed as a platform for Artificial Intelligence research and human interaction applications. It was launched at CES in Las Vegas USA in January 2022. Its main focus on human-like expressions and range of facial movement. In its demonstration, it was made to mimic an operator's face using a mobile phone that had built-in LIDAR and used Apple's ARKit tools.

=== Mesmer ===
Mesmer is a humanoid robot. Its key design feature is its face covered by a skin-like rubber, that can exhibit human-like expressions and characteristics. It was created and manufactured using 3D scans of human models taken in-house, allowing Engineered Arts to accurately mimic human bone form, skin texture, and emotions.

=== Robothespian ===
RoboThespian is an interactive, animatronic humanoid robot with LCD screens for eyes, powered by Pneumatic motors, it and speaks more than 30 languages, and can be found on public display worldwide.

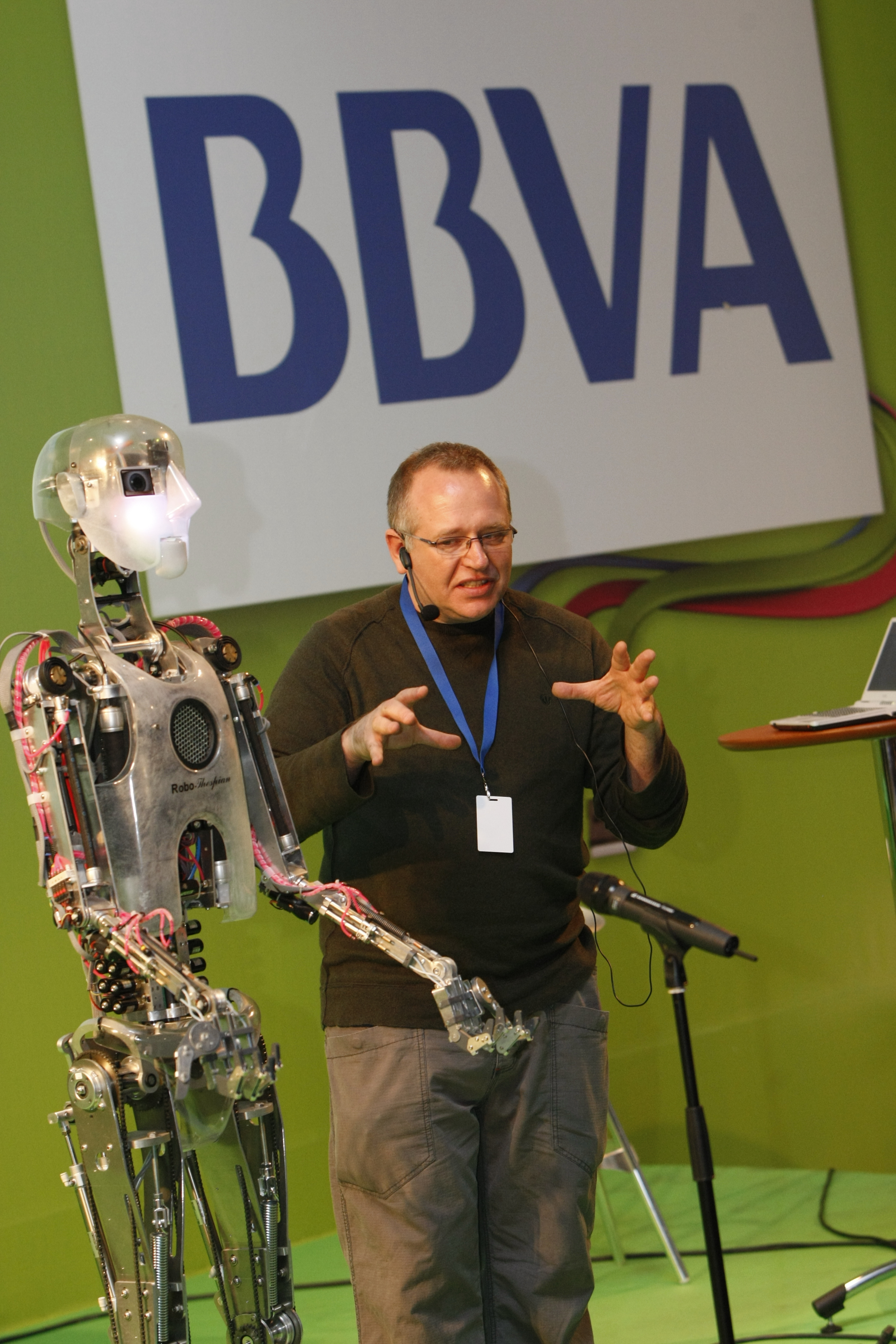
Will Jackson (right) of Engineered Arts with the Robothespian

It is 1.75 metres (5 ft 9 in) tall, weighs in at 33 kilograms (73 lb), sports an aluminium chassis and a body shell made of polyethylene terephthalate plastic and its body offers over 30 axes of movement.

Internally it uses a Parallax processor for motor control.

Over fifty are currently permanently installed worldwide, including:

- NASA Kennedy Space Center, USA.
- Questacon, National Science Museum of Australia
- MUNCYT (Museo Nacional de Ciencia e Tecnología), National Science and Technology Museum in Spain
- Parc Futuroscope, France.
- Copernicus Science Centre, Poland (complete Theatre of Robots stage production, comprising 3 RoboThespians, integrated lighting, video projection, multi channel sound).
- Parque de las Ciencias, Granada Spain. Early adopter of RT 2, and upgraded RT 3 later.
- Israel's National Museum of Science, Technology & Space
- Thinktank, Birmingham Science Museum
- Carnegie Science Center
- Aberdeen Science centre
- Museum of Science and Industry (Chicago)
- W5 Belfast, Ireland

Academic institutions, including:

- University of North Carolina, USA.
- University Central Florida, USA
- Bristol Robotics Laboratory, UK
- University College London, UK
- University of Brighton, UK
- University of Barcelona, Spain

=== Socibot ===
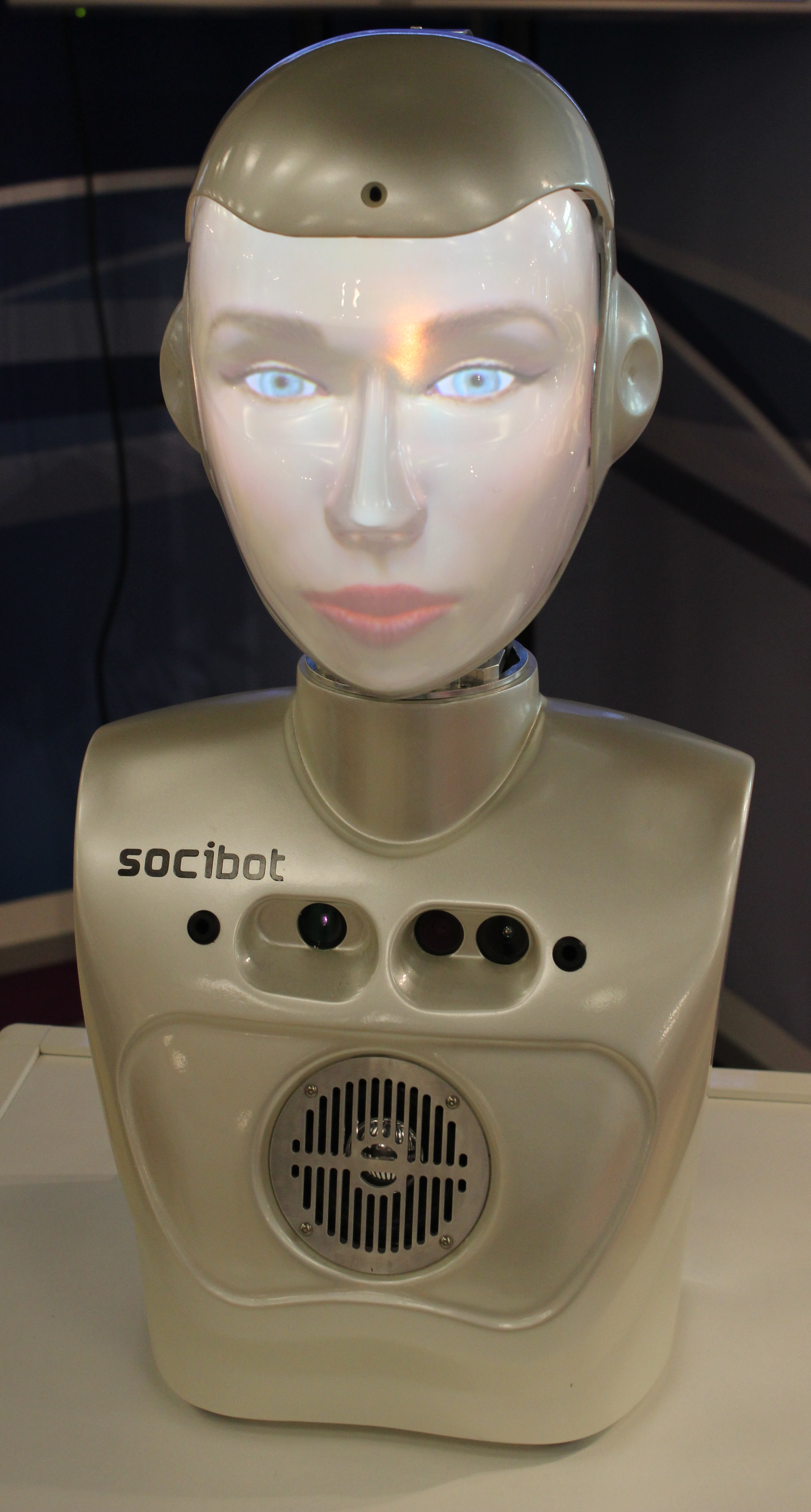
Innorobo 2015 - Engineered Arts - Socibot

Socibot was a static torso with a projected face. It integrated the core technologies of RoboThespian but in a desktop- or kiosk-sized form-factor. With a projected computer-generated face and articulated neck, it served as a simple and relatively inexpensive introduction to robotics.

This robot has been sold to places such as:

Public installations:

- Putnam Museum, Iowa, USA
- Parc Futuroscope, France
- Espace des Sciences, France
- Bal Robotov, Russia

Academic institutions, including:

- Bristol Robot Laboratory, UK
- University of Craiova, Romania
- Nanyang Polytechnic, Singapore
- Coventry University, UK

== Custom robots ==
=== Ai-Da ===
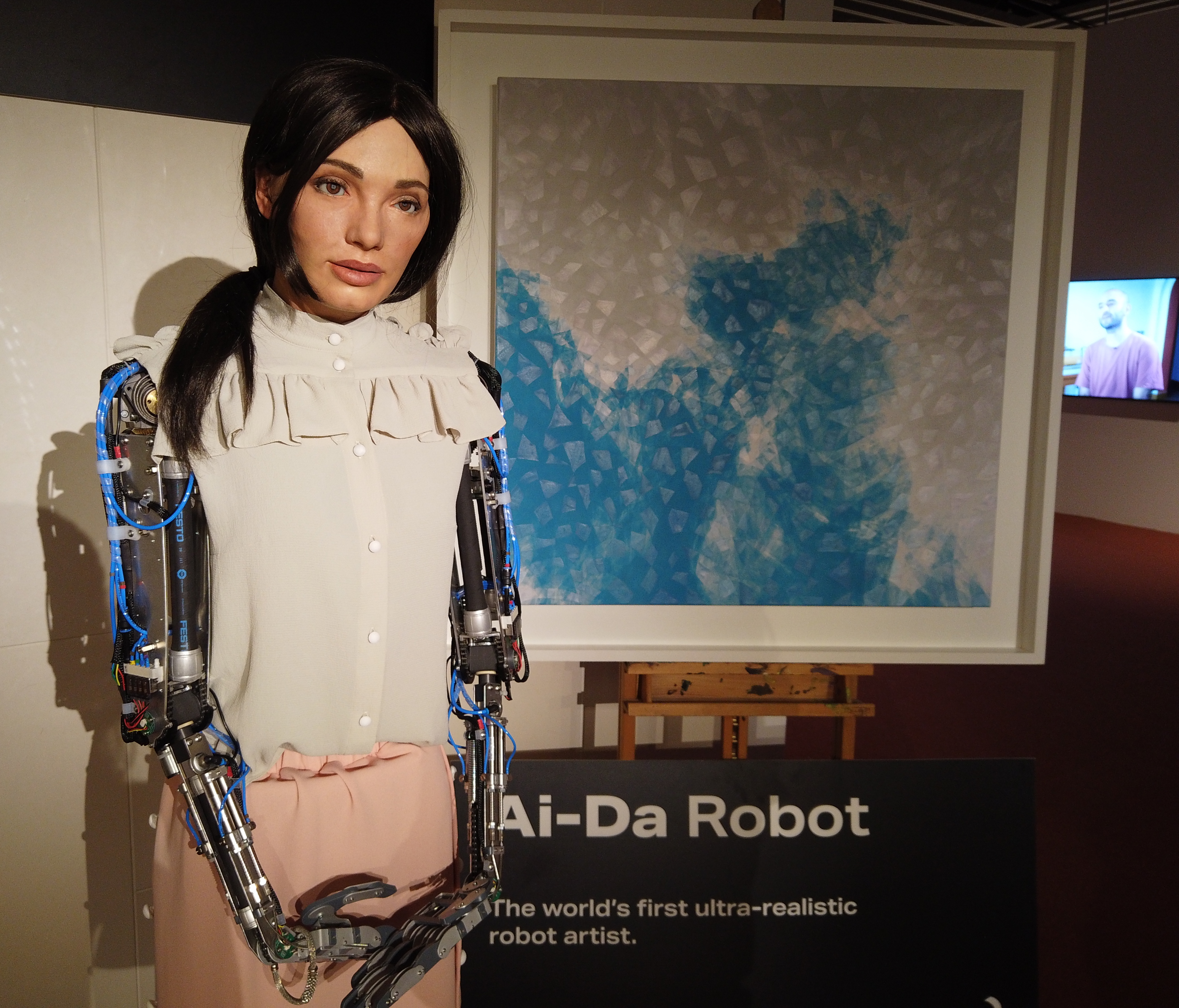
Ai-Da Robot at Abu Dhabi Art

Ai-Da is a humanoid robot based on the Robothespian platform. Completed in 2019, Ai-Da contains no conversational AI capabilities and is tele-operated using Engineered Arts Tin Man software. Its core function is creating drawings, paintings, and sculptures, with the use of a bionic hand and ocular cameras. She is named after Ada Lovelace.

=== Dr Kalam ===
A variation on the standard Mesmer, this robot was modelled after 11th President of India, Avul Pakir Jainulabdeen Abdul Kalam for display at Military Might, Chandrapur, Maharashtra.

=== Fred ===
Fred was created as part of the PR campaign to promote the TV series Westworld. The robot employed Tin-Man technology to interact with customers in a London pub.

== Technologies ==
Rather than use an "off the shelf" operating system such as ROS, Engineered Arts uses its own OS called "Tritium". It is designed to make their robots easy to program by non-technical people and operated from any location.

Tinman a telepresence program that allows a robot's owners to communicate with an audience via the robot's "personality", while themselves being remote.

IOServe provides a generic way to link and program all robot hardware and runs under Linux. It has the ability to capture motion data and replay it and modify existing motion sequences on the fly, including an interface to the open source 3D program Blender.

== In popular culture ==
- A projected-face version of Robothespian performed alongside two humans in a play called The Uncanny Valley, which made its New York City premiere at the Brick Theater in Brooklyn in 2015.
- A projected-face version of Robothespian performed in a play called 'Spillikin' at Pleasance Theatre in Edinburgh, Scotland in March 2017.
- The 2015 National Geographic movie Robots-3D, Robothespian hosted the film and was voiced by actor Simon Pegg.
- In April 2022, Engineered Arts created a doppelgänger of YouTuber Tom Scott.

== See also ==
- Biomimetics
