= The Gate of the Year =

1908 poem by Minnie Louise Haskins

"The Gate of the Year" is the popular name given to a poem by Minnie Louise Haskins. The poem was originally published with the title, "God Knows" by the author. Haskins studied and taught at the London School of Economics in the first half of the twentieth century.

== Background ==
The poem, written in 1908 and privately published in 1912, was part of a collection titled The Desert. It caught the public attention and the popular imagination when King George VI quoted it in his 1939 Christmas broadcast to the British Empire. The poem may have been brought to his attention by his wife, Queen Elizabeth (the Queen Consort).

The book The Servant Queen and the King She Serves, published for Queen Elizabeth II's 90th birthday, says that it was the young Princess Elizabeth herself, aged 13, who handed the poem to her father. The book's foreword was written by Elizabeth II herself.

The poem was widely acclaimed as inspirational, reaching its first mass audience in the early days of the Second World War. Its words remained a source of comfort to Queen Elizabeth, the Queen Mother, for the rest of her life. Elizabeth had its words engraved on stone plaques and fixed to the gates of the King George VI Memorial Chapel at Windsor Castle, where the King was interred. The Queen Mother was also buried there in 2002, and the words of "The Gate of the Year" were included in a reflection in her funeral's order of service.

The poem was included in the closing moments of the 1940 Metro-Goldwyn-Mayer/Frank Borzage film The Mortal Storm, starring Margaret Sullavan, James Stewart and Robert Young.

== Text ==
THE GATE OF THE YEAR

'God Knows'

And I said to the man who stood at the gate of the year:
"Give me a light that I may tread safely into the unknown".
And he replied:
"Go out into the darkness and put your hand into the Hand of God.
That shall be to you better than light and safer than a known way".
So I went forth, and finding the Hand of God, trod gladly into the night.
And He led me towards the hills and the breaking of day in the lone East.

So heart be still:
What need our little life
Our human life to know,
If God hath comprehension?
In all the dizzy strife
Of things both high and low,
God hideth His intention.

God knows. His will
Is best. The stretch of years
Which wind ahead, so dim
To our imperfect vision,
Are clear to God. Our fears
Are premature; In Him,
All time hath full provision.

Then rest: until
God moves to lift the veil
From our impatient eyes,
When, as the sweeter features
Of Life's stern face we hail,
Fair beyond all surmise
God's thought around His creatures
Our mind shall fill.
