= Prime Minister's New Year Message =

Annual speech by UK Prime Minister

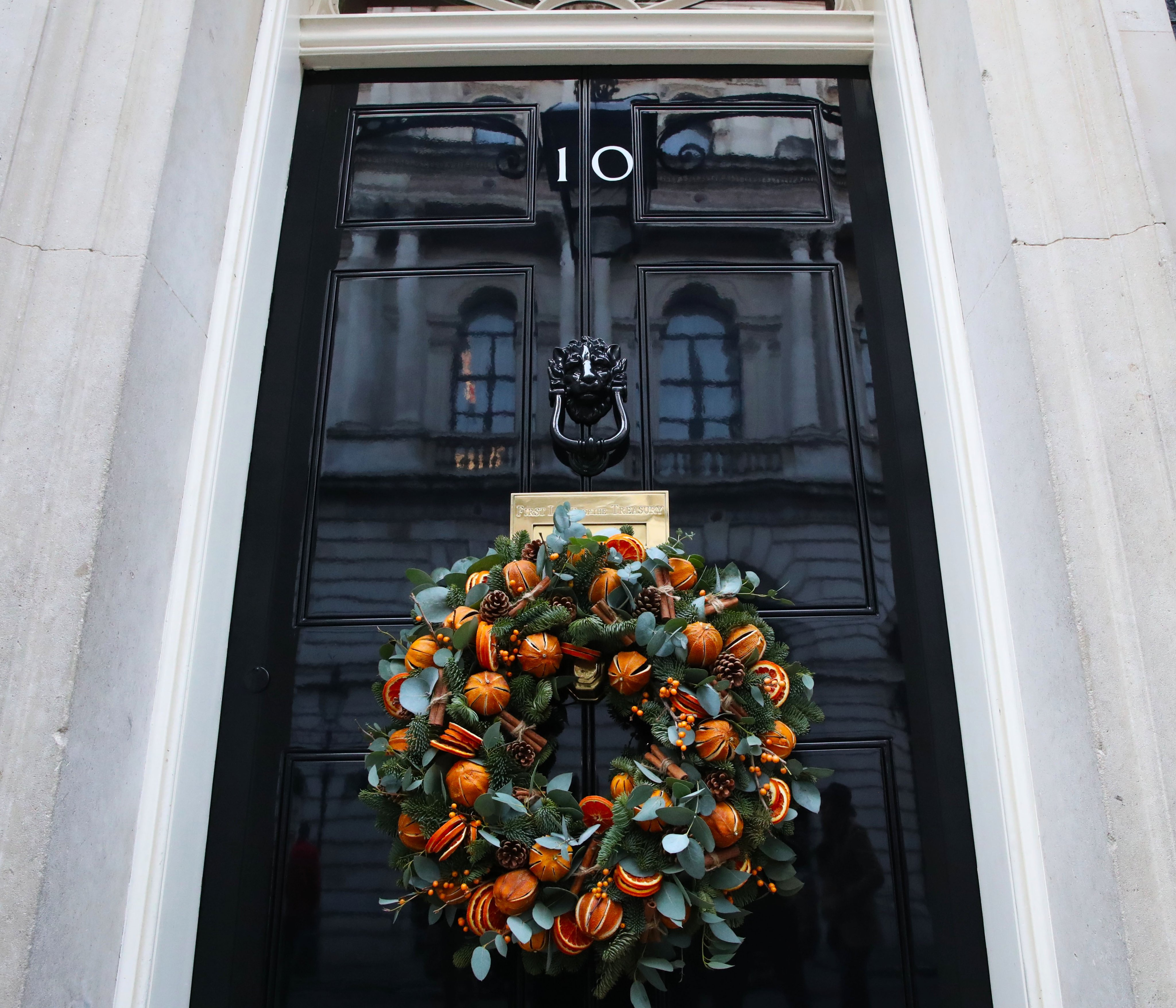
The new year message from the prime minister is usually written and then recorded at 10 Downing Street.

The Prime Minister's New Year Message in the United Kingdom is an annual speech made by the prime minister for the start of a new year. It is traditionally released around New Year's Eve and Hogmanay throughout Britain, consisting of a speech which is a few minutes long and usually contains reflections upon what has taken place throughout the previous year. This is then followed by a government-backed preview of what can be expected in the coming new year and the current political state of the nation. Beyond politics, the message also includes sentiments and achievements from throughout the year, and national events that have taken place.

Other political leaders in Britain use the new year as a chance to release their message to reflect on the year and inform the public on what may be expected in the coming year, this includes the leader of the opposition in the British Parliament and leaders of the devolved governments. Since 1932, the British monarch traditionally releases the Royal Christmas Message which is alternatively broadcast on Christmas Day throughout the UK and the Commonwealth.

== Past messages ==
=== 2010s ===
Prime Minister	New year	Notes
Gordon Brown	2010	As Prime Minister, Gordon Brown in his new year message reflected on how his government had seen off the worst of the 2008 recession and as Britain entered into a general election year, he wanted a new decade of prosperity for everyone and not just the privileged few. He reflected on the Christmas Day bomb plot on Northwest Airlines Flight 253, insisting terrorism threatens to put Britain's safety at risk, therefore he would make this a priority along with Afghanistan. In the new year he wanted to invest in Britain's future industries such as High-speed rail in the United Kingdom and green energy.
David Cameron	2011	Following the 2010 general election in the last year, the Conservative Party entered into power, the Labour Party entered into opposition, and the Cameron–Clegg coalition was formed. David Cameron in his first new year message as Prime Minister stated the actions the government would be making allowed them to put the country on the right path; 2011 was remarked as being the year Britain could get back on its feet. The country needed to tackle the deficit, and upcoming austerity measures in the new year were not due to political ideology. He stated the country would become an international success story and though working as a coalition government was not easy, decisions in the new year would be in the nations best interest and it had a bright future.
David Cameron	2012	In the new year Britain would host the 2012 Olympics and the Diamond Jubilee of Elizabeth II; it was stated the world would look to Britain and it was the job of the coalition government to get the country up to strength as the world watched. The message promoted the 'Big Society' and focused on the need to bring down the deficit by pushing forward as Europe's economy struggled. He wanted to sort out public services and reform welfare; however, economic recovery in the new year was a priority.
David Cameron	2013	The message reflected on a great previous year for Britain, and focused on the national debt that still needed to be brought down. The government had successfully reduced it to being £13 billion smaller than the previous new year. The country could look forward to realism and optimism in 2013 as the government mentioned positive changes in education, welfare system and pensions.
David Cameron	2014	Being the year Scotland was to host the 2014 independence referendum, Cameron in his new year message stated that 2014 would be a significant year for the country, and a vital year for the British economy. He urged the people of Scotland to stay and help build a stronger Britain. The government would be backing small businesses, cutting income tax, capping welfare, controlling immigration and investing in education as Britain and Europe continued to recover from the recession.
David Cameron	2015	In the new year, voters would go to the polls for the 2015 general election; Cameron urged people in his message to stick to the long-term plan of creating prosperity and securing a better future. The global economy remained uncertain as they entered into 2015; however, the country could choose competence or taking a huge risk of going back as they think about voting in May.
David Cameron	2016	Cameron in his message stated the economy was growing in strength, and having formed a majority government following the election year the country could continue to renew its strength. More than 31 million Britons would start the year in employment, the most on record in Britain. It was promised the country would hold a referendum on Britain's membership of the European union by the end of 2017. There was a focus on solving the housing market, social issues and concerns with national security.
Theresa May	2017	In her first new year message as Prime Minister, Theresa May focused on unity and urged people to reflect on the previous year following the EU referendum. 2017 would be the year the nation started to make its exit from the European Union. Though not everyone shared the same view points, and the referendum was divisive, she urged people to unite as one nation as it started to build a new future. She stated it was not just big events, but also small personal events that defined our year. She paid tribute to Jo Cox, MP for Batley and Spen who was murdered by a right-wing extremist a week before the EU referendum.
Theresa May	2018	May reflected on progress made on Britain's departure from the EU in the last year, having triggered Article 50 of the Treaty on European Union in March. The government had started the first phase of negotiations with member nations and was ready to move onto trade and security in the new year. She stated people just wanted the government to get on with Brexit, but there was also other issues which effected peoples daily lives. The government would continue to invest in the National Health Service as it celebrated its 70th birthday. The country would celebrate 100 years of women being able to vote and the centenary of the end of World War I. The government would work to be a continued force for peace, fight against discrimination and work towards solving climate change and plastic within the ocean.
Theresa May	2019	May in her message looked to start a new chapter, urging people to choose her Brexit deal. She wanted 2019 to be the time people in Britain put their differences aside and work together to form a new relationship with the European Union and the world. Theresa May stated the national debt was beginning to fall sustainably, absolute poverty was at record lows and employment was high. In the new year the government hoped to have potential to achieve more.

=== 2020s ===
Prime Minister	New year	Notes
Boris Johnson	2020	In his first new year address as Prime Minister, Boris Johnson focused on the theme of renewing Britain and bringing people together to the heal divisions seen in 2019. He stated it would be a decade of prosperity and opportunity for Britain as the country aimed to leave the European Union. He aimed to represent everyone who voted both leave and remain, as well as those who would have not traditionally voted for the Conservatives in the 2019 general election. He wanted to increase education standards, enshrine national health service fund rises into law, create new trade relationships, as well as freezing VAT, income tax and national insurance in the new year.
Boris Johnson	2021	Johnson commented that despite the deaths of the COVID-19 pandemic and national lockdowns, positivity could be seen in the Clap for Our Carers movement, dedication of essential workers and volunteers and Oxford–AstraZeneca COVID-19 vaccine. He looked forward to hosting the G7 summit and COP26 conference.
Boris Johnson	2022	Johnson spoke about the UK's recovery from the COVID-19 pandemic, saying that the country was "incomparable better" than it had been a year before. He celebrated the UK's economic growth, the government's efforts to increase booster rollout, and the spoke to the importance of getting vaccinated.
Rishi Sunak	2023	Sunak focused on the National Heath Service strikes and the anxiety it was causing to people. He said that New Year should be a time of optimism and excitement, but acknowledged many people would look ahead to 2023 with apprehension. Sunak said that his government will always reflect the people's priorities, that NHS waiting lists would fall, and that his government will rebuild trust in politics.
Rishi Sunak	2024	[icon]
Keir Starmer	2025	Following the 2024 general election in the last year, the Labour entered into power, the Conservatives entered into opposition, and the Starmer ministry was formed.
Keir Starmer	2026	Starmer stated that, while "things have been tough in Britain for a while", people would feel "positive change" in 2026 despite "decline and division".

== See also ==
- Royal Christmas message
