= 2022 Joe Biden speech in Warsaw =

Speech on the Russian invasion of Ukraine

Remarks by President Biden on the United Efforts of the Free World to Support the People of Ukraine
- Full video of the speech as published by the White House
- Date: March 26, 2022 (4 years ago)
- Time: 18:16 CET (17:16 UTC)
- Duration: 27 minutes
- Venue: In the courtyard of the Royal Castle
- Location: Warsaw, Poland; 52.2477°N 21.0141°E
- Type: Speech and rally
- Cause: 2022 Russian invasion of Ukraine

On March 26, 2022, roughly a month after Russia launched a full-scale invasion of Ukraine, U.S. president Joe Biden delivered a public speech in the courtyard of the Royal Castle in Warsaw, Poland.

During the speech, Biden framed the military struggle in Ukraine as a fight between autocracy and democracy, and confirmed that under NATO's Article 5, the troops of NATO have "a sacred obligation ... to defend each and every inch of NATO territory with the full force of our collective power". He also praised the "brave and stiff Ukrainian resistance" and "the generosity of ... the Polish people", while making it clear that "the Russian people ... are not our enemy".

Near the end of his speech, Biden referred to Russian president Vladimir Putin when he said, "For God's sake, this man cannot remain in power." A number of world leaders expressed disapproval over this statement. The Biden administration later stated that these words had not been part of the prepared speech, and that the administration was not proposing a regime change. This remark overshadowed the rest of Biden's speech.

About 11 months later, Biden returned to Warsaw to deliver another speech, in which he reiterated that the current conflict was a fight between democracy and autocracy, and reaffirmed NATO's commitment to Article 5.

== Background ==
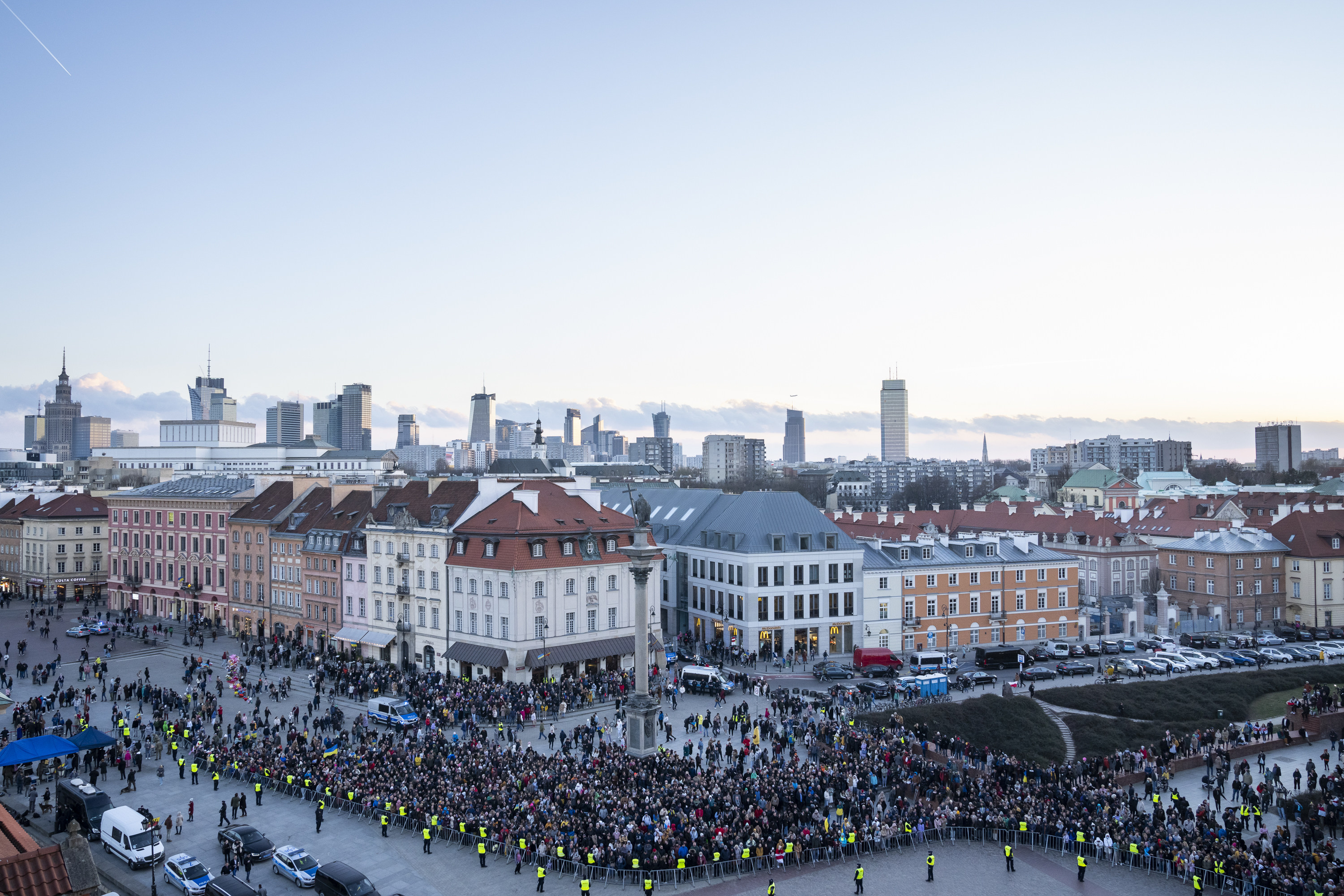
Crowds gathering in the square outside the castle before the speech

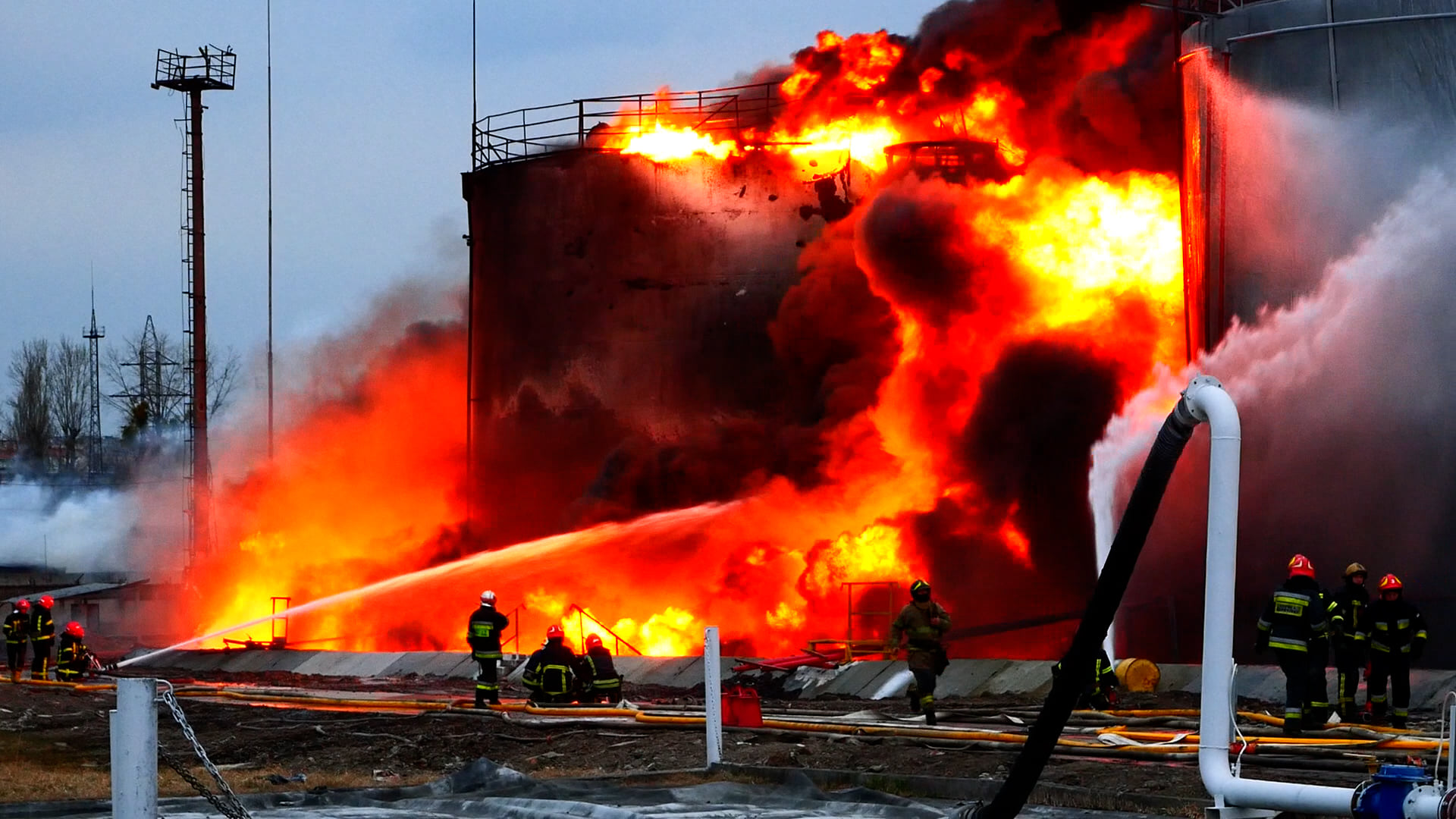
A fire at a fuel depot in Lviv, caused by a missile attack earlier that day

Russia launched a full-scale invasion of Ukraine on February 24, 2022. In response, NATO scheduled an extraordinary summit in Brussels, Belgium, to take place on the first day of a previously scheduled meeting of the European Council in Brussels, on March 24, 2022. German chancellor Olaf Scholz, who held the rotating presidency of the G7 that year, invited the other G7 leaders to a summit to be held on the same day in Brussels. (Note: The G7 summit in Brussels was said to be "embedded in the NATO summit and the European Council", while the 48th G7 summit was hosted by Scholz at Schloss Elmau in Bavaria later that year.)

In March, U.S. president Joe Biden flew to Europe and attended all three meetings in person. Afterward, Biden continued on to Poland, where he spoke to U.S. troops, conferred with Polish president Andrzej Duda, and met with humanitarian aid workers and Ukrainian refugees. (Note: During his trip, Biden mentioned that he had wished to get a closer look at the situation in Ukraine. He stated that "[t]hey will not let me understandably, I guess, cross the border and take a look at what's going on in Ukraine", due to security issues.) After seeing the refugees gathered at Warsaw's Stadion Narodowy ('national stadium'), when asked what he thought of Russian president Vladimir Putin, Biden said, "He's a butcher." At the end of his trip, Biden delivered a speech at the Royal Castle in Warsaw, on the evening of March 26, 2022, after rockets had struck a fuel depot in the western Ukrainian city of Lviv earlier that day.

Biden had spoken in Warsaw previously, at the University of Warsaw in 1997 when he was a U.S. senator. His earlier speech had discussed issues regarding Poland's request to join NATO.

== Speech ==
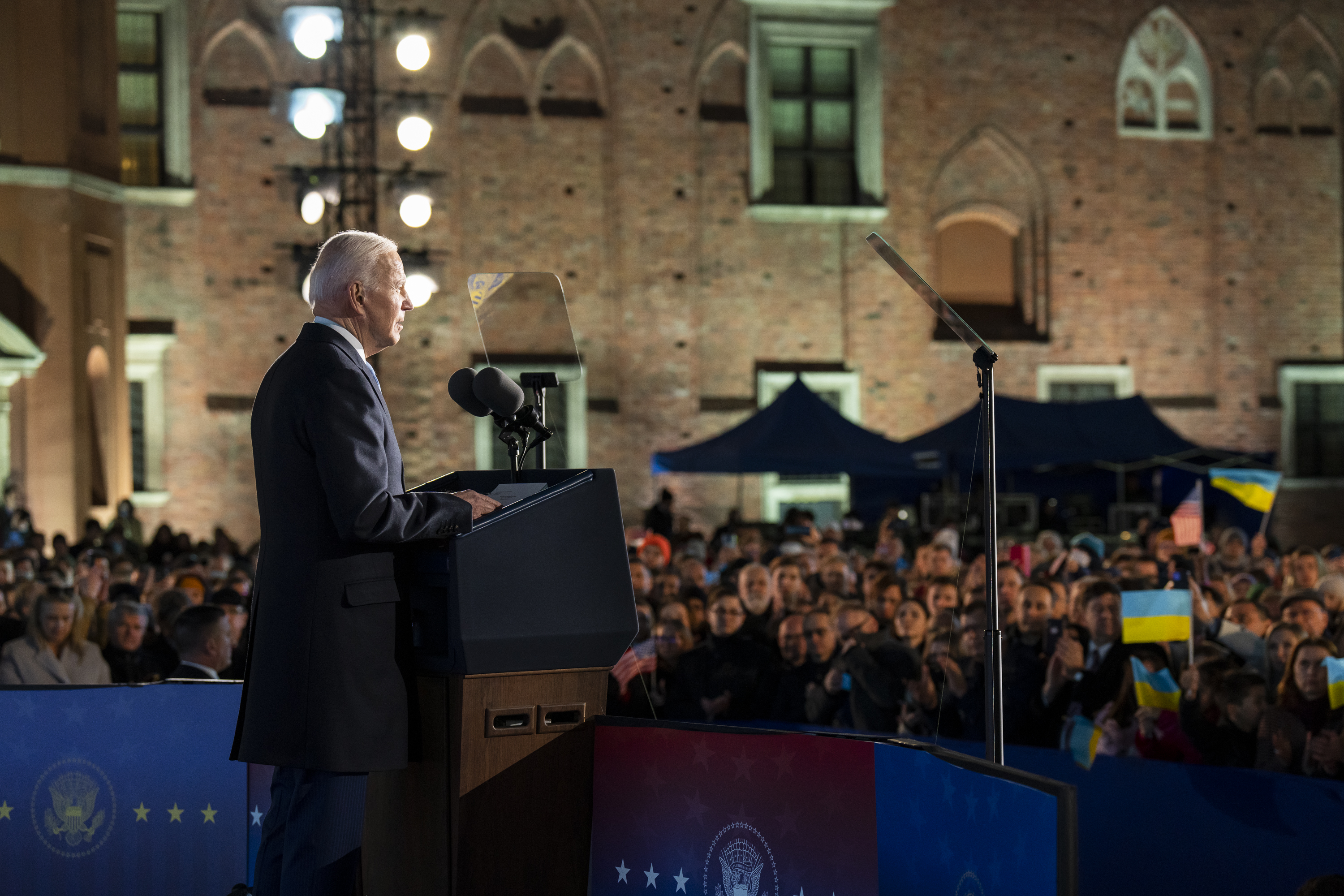
President Biden delivering the speech in the courtyard of the Royal Castle in Warsaw

Biden delivered his speech from the inner courtyard of the Royal Castle. The speech began at 18:16 CET (17:16 UTC) and lasted 27 minutes. Biden opened his speech with a reference to Pope John Paul II and his message to "[b]e not afraid". The speech also paid tribute to Lech Wałęsa, leader of the anti-Soviet Solidarity movement during the 1980s.

Biden then compared the Russian invasion of Ukraine with events of the previous century when Poland was an oppressed satellite state under the hegemony of the Soviet Union, describing them all as part of a struggle between autocracy and democracy, and warned that there was still a "long fight ahead". He asserted that "the battle for democracy ... did not conclude with the end of the Cold War", and that Russia was "strangl[ing] democracy", both domestically and abroad. He then reaffirmed the commitment that NATO members had made under Article 5, calling it "a sacred obligation ... to defend each and every inch of NATO territory with the full force of our collective power".

Biden also stated that the invading Russians had met "brave and stiff Ukrainian resistance", contrary to Putin's expectations. Biden also mentioned that he was "struck by the generosity of ... the Polish people" in their efforts to help Ukrainian refugees. Biden also reached out to the Russian people, stating that "the Russian people ... are not our enemy", and telling them that "this war is not worthy of you".

Biden then listed three points that he said the invasion had made clear: (1) Europe must end its reliance on Russian fossil fuels, (2) corruption in the Kremlin must be rooted out, and (3) democracies of the world must unite in a fight against autocracy. Biden described the last point, the fight against autocracy, as "the task of our time ... [t]he task of this generation".

Near the end of his speech, immediately before he said his farewells, Biden referred to Putin when he stated, "For God's sake, this man cannot remain in power." This statement appeared to conflict with previously established U.S. policy, which had not advocated for a regime change. (Note: Earlier in the month, U.S. secretary of state Antony Blinken had stated, "For us, it's not about regime change. The Russian people have to decide who they want to lead them".) A Biden administration official stated that this remark was not part of the prepared speech. (Note: The Washington Post noted that when Biden strayed from previously prepared words, it often occurred near the end of a speech.) Minutes after the speech ended, the administration had already begun walking back the president's words. One of Biden's officials stated that Biden had meant that "Putin cannot be allowed to exercise power over his neighbors or the region", and that Biden was not referring to Putin's exercise of power in Russia.

== Reactions ==
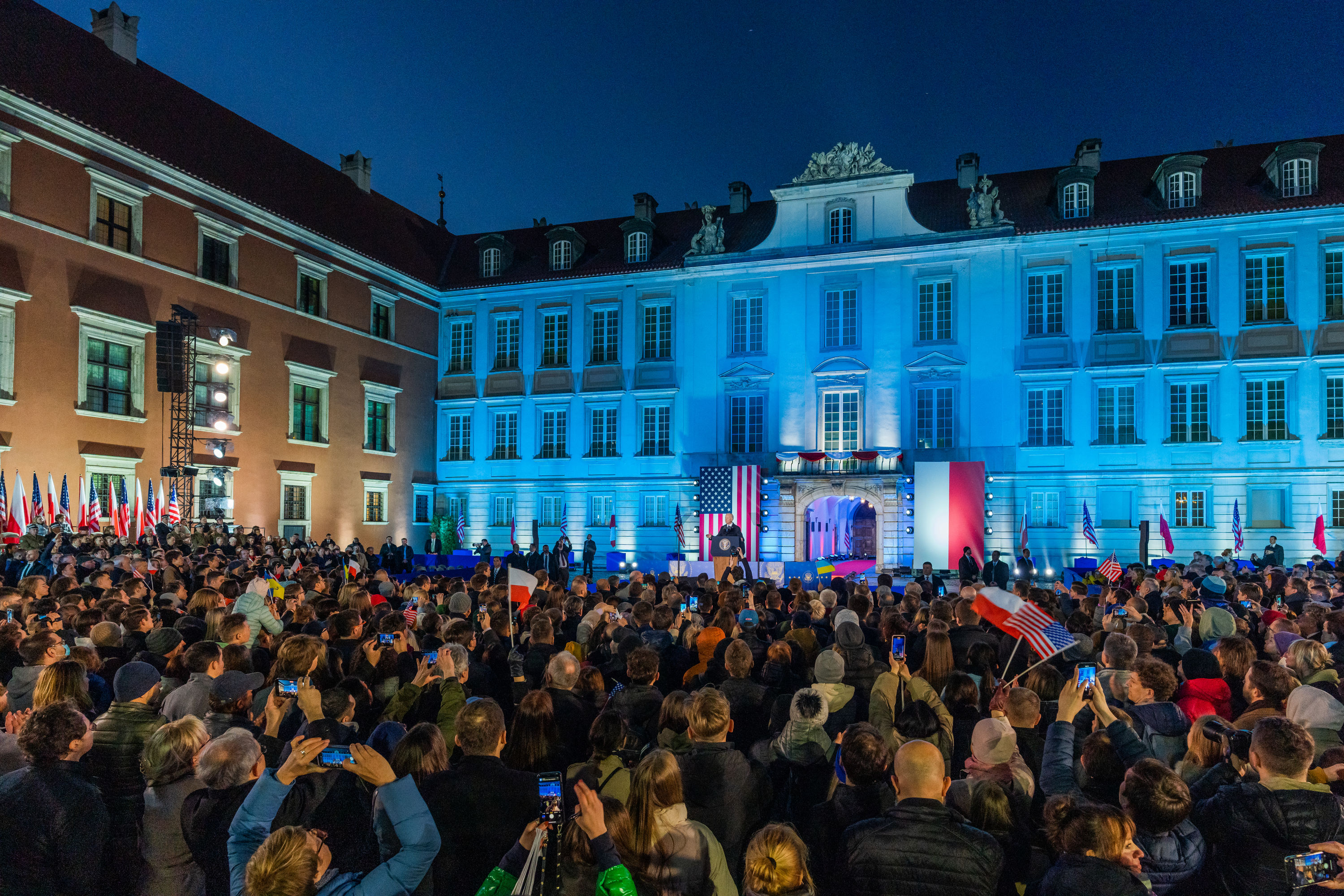
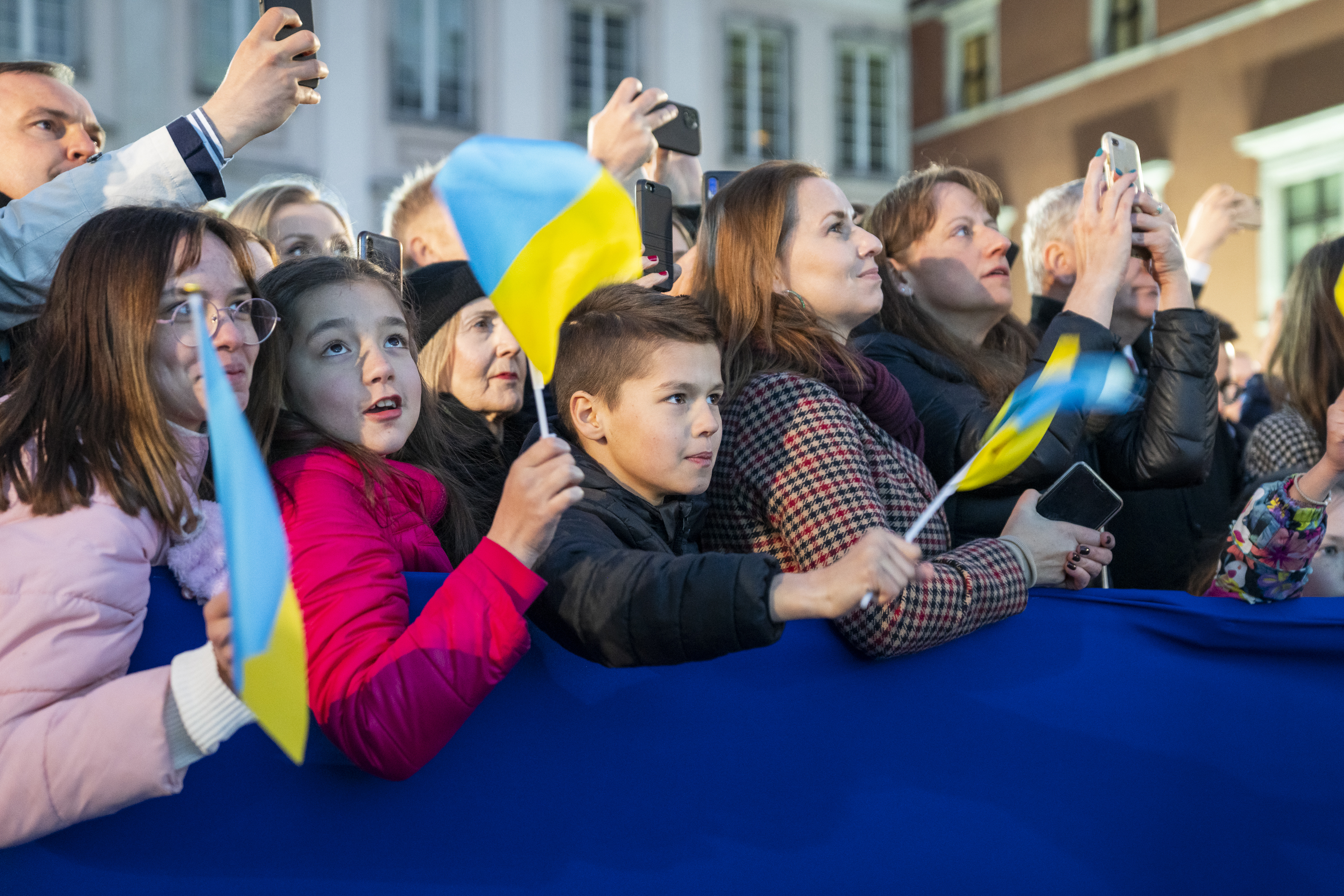
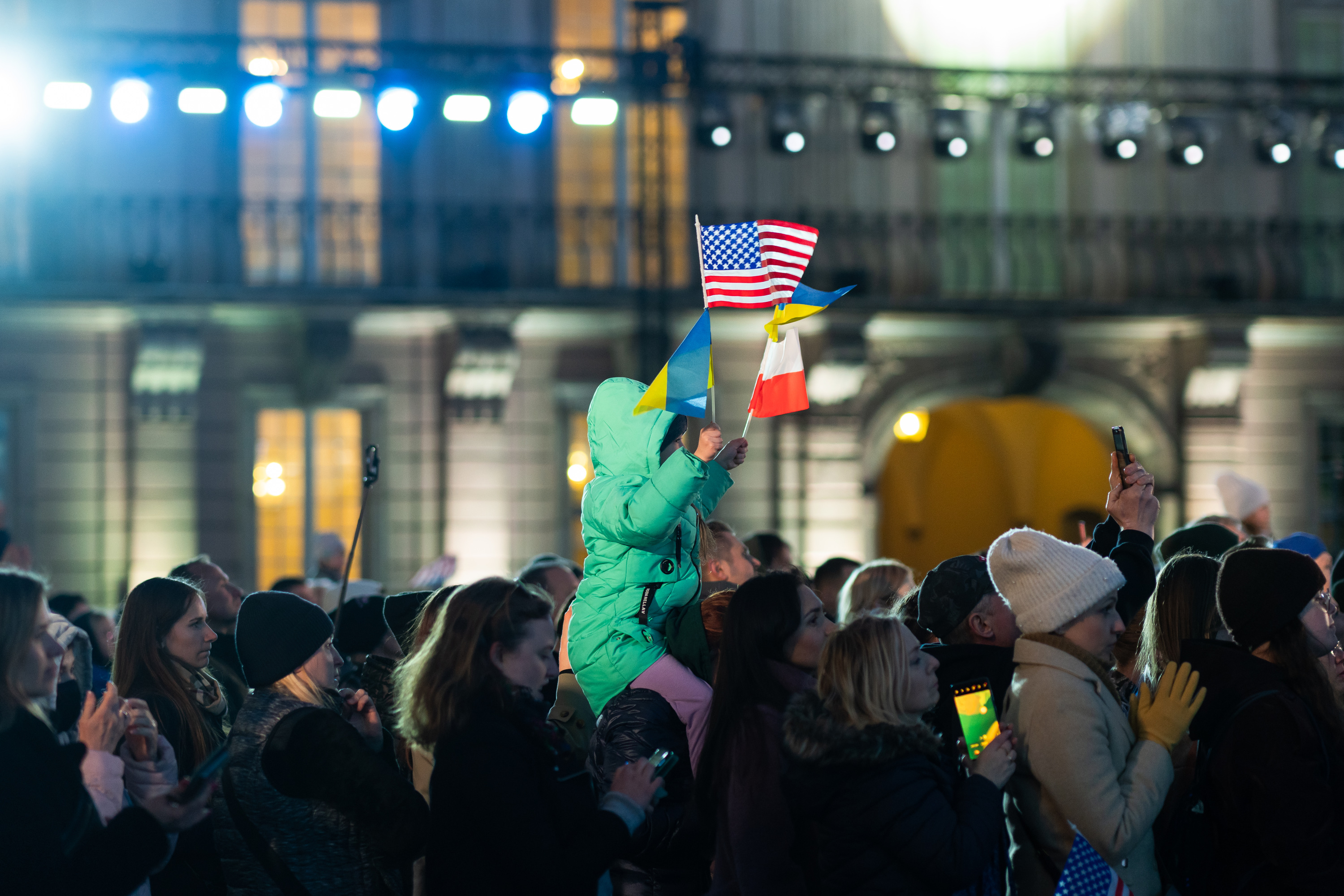
Audience members in the courtyard

In reference to Biden's final remarks, Kremlin press secretary Dmitry Peskov stated, "This is not to be decided by Mr. Biden. It should only be a choice of the people of the Russian Federation." Peskov denounced the use of "[p]ersonal insults like this", and stated that "[a] state leader should control his temper". Russian billionaire Oleg Deripaska stated that Biden's speech hinted at the start of some form of "hellish ideological mobilisation" that could prolong the invasion.

French president Emmanuel Macron stated that he would not have chosen to use Biden's words during an already precarious situation, and added that his own goal was to "achiev[e] first a ceasefire and then the total withdrawal of [Russian] troops by diplomatic means". U.K. education minister Nadhim Zahawi called it "a very powerful speech" and added that he thought "both the US and the UK agree that it's up to the Russian people to decide who should be governing them". İbrahim Kalın, adviser to the Turkish president, stated, "We have to create an environment in which every country ... feel[s] safe enough in the international order that they do not resort to any kind of disruptive action."

The nine-word comment that Biden ad-libbed at the end of his speech distracted from the rest of his message. Aaron David Miller, senior fellow at the Carnegie Endowment for International Peace, observed that Biden's "one-liner ... drown[ed] out the intent of the speech [as] that's exactly what people are focusing on", and described the remark as "a gaffe from the heart". Richard Haass, president of the Council on Foreign Relations, stated that Biden's words would lower the chances of finding a compromise with Putin, and that although the administration backpedalled from the statement within minutes, "[t]he problem is, from Putin's point of view the president revealed his and our true intentions".

== Aftermath ==
Nearly a year later, and days before the anniversary of the start of Russia's full-scale invasion, Biden returned to Warsaw's Royal Castle to deliver another speech, which reiterated his point that the world was witnessing a battle between autocracy and democracy, and that the members of NATO would defend "every inch of NATO territory". (Note: Biden spoke in the lower gardens of the castle in 2023, in front of the Kubicki Arcades.) The speech was made a day after Biden paid a visit to Kyiv, his first to Ukraine during the invasion, and was delivered hours after Putin had given his own Presidential Address to the Federal Assembly at Gostiny Dvor in Moscow, in which he announced that Russia was suspending its participation in the nuclear disarmament treaty New START.

== See also ==
- 2017 Donald Trump speech in Warsaw
- 2022 Zeitenwende speech, delivered by German chancellor Olaf Scholz days after the invasion began
- 2022 Moscow rally, held about a week before Biden's speech
- Government-organized demonstration
