= List of national addresses =

National broadcast to the general public

This list of national addresses includes speeches by heads of state or heads of government, often broadcast live over various media (usually radio and television) and directed at the general public. These often take the form of an annual address near the end of the year, but can also respond to pressing current and global events.

== Africa ==
- State of the Nation (Ghana)
- State of the Nation Address (South Africa)

== Americas ==
=== Latin America ===
- Cadena nacional (various countries)

=== United States ===
- Fireside chats
- State of the Union
- United States Oval Office Address
- Weekly address of the president of the United States

== Asia ==
- State of the Nation Address (Philippines)

== Europe ==
- State of the Union (European Union)

=== Belarus ===
- State of the Nation Address (Belarus)

=== Luxembourg ===
- State of the Nation (Luxembourg)

=== Russia ===
- Presidential Address to the Federal Assembly
- New Year Address by the President of Russia

=== Spain ===
- Christmas Eve National Speech

=== United Kingdom ===
- Prime Minister's New Year Message
- Royal Christmas Message
- Special address by the British monarch
