= Annual speeches by heads of state and government =

Annual addresses on New Year's Eve

Heads of state and heads of government address their people to coincide with a given national or religious holiday, such as a national day, the New Year, or Christmas.

These speeches may typically include a summary of political, social or economic issues and past events, or additionally an overview of prospects for the coming year if taking place at year's end.

== List of speeches ==
=== Christmas ===
1932 Royal Christmas Message
The full text of the speech at Wikisource

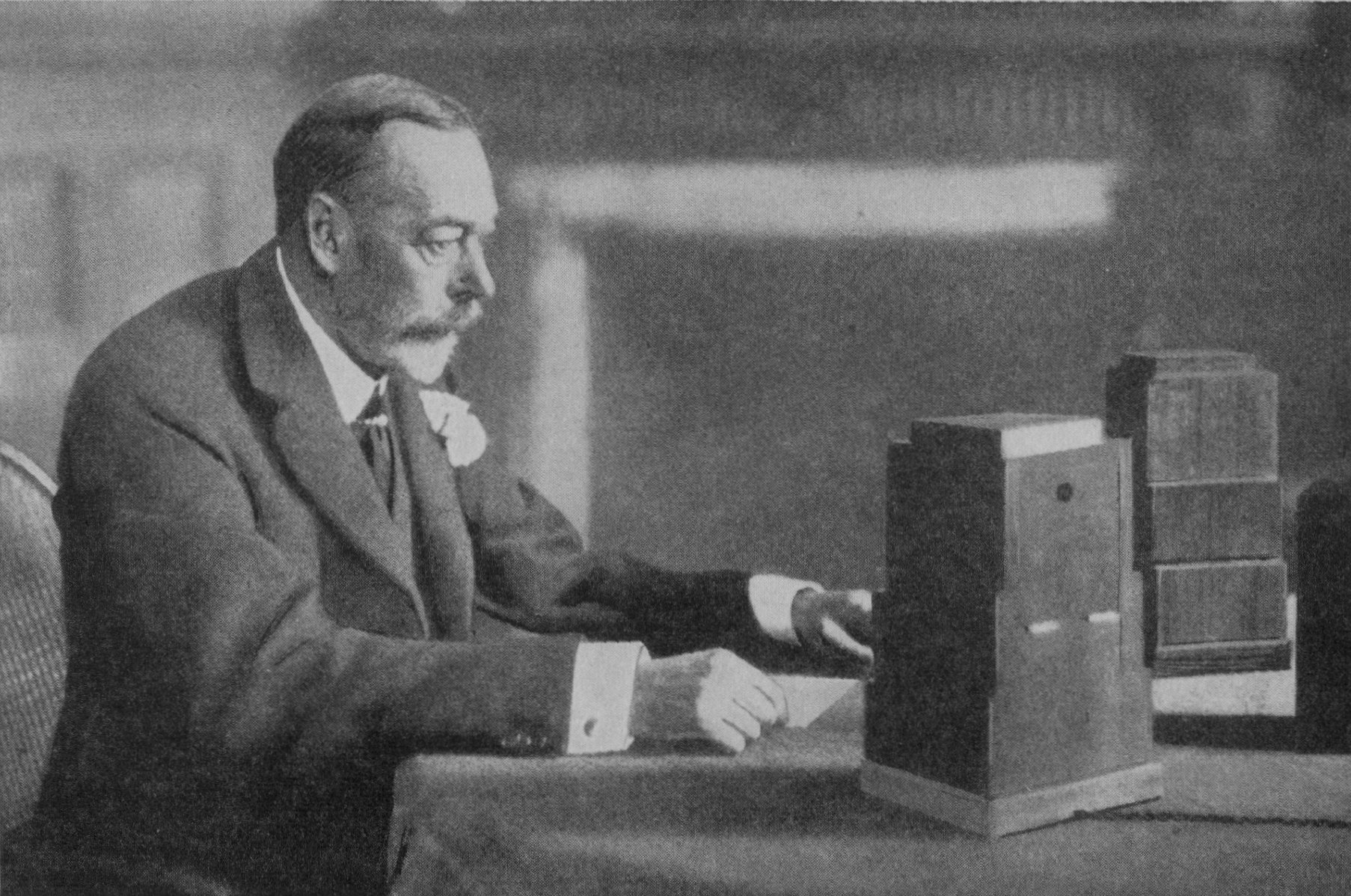
George V giving the 1934 Royal Christmas message

The original practice was to issue a broadcast coinciding with Christmas. Queen Wilhelmina of the Netherlands published a written Christmas greeting in 1914, during World War I, and went on to make the first such address on radio in 1931. During the reign of her daughter Juliana, it became an annual tradition. The monarchs of the Commonwealth realms have addressed the public at Christmas since 1932, when George V delivered the first such broadcast via the British Broadcasting Corporation's Empire Service. The royal message was televised for the first time in 1957, during the reign of Elizabeth II.

In Spain, Francisco Franco first addressed the "fighters of Spain for the cause" at the end of 1937, during the Spanish civil war, and in his subsequent rule delivered an annual broadcast at the end of each year beginning in 1946. The practice was inherited by the Spanish monarch after Franco's death in 1975.

In post-war Germany, the annual Christmas broadcast was delivered by the chancellor from 1949 until 1969, and by the president from 1970 onwards. The speech by the Belgian monarch is usually delivered separately in Dutch and French, the two most-spoken languages in Belgium. A separate broadcast in German, another official language, was made for the first time by king Philippe in 2013.

The President of the United States may give out Christmas messages as part of their weekly address. Some of these messages come out within a few days before Christmas or on Christmas Day. The president may also give a Christmas message to soldiers serving in the United States Armed Forces. The opposition party may also give out Christmas messages as part of their response to the president's weekly address.

Other heads of state have also adopted the tradition of a message at Christmas, including the King of Sweden, the Grand Duke of Luxembourg, the President of Ireland, and the O le Ao o le Malo of Samoa. The Pope, who is also head of state of the Vatican City, makes a Christmas address as part of his Urbi et Orbi. The Prime Minister of Canada also records a short Christmas greeting.

=== New Year ===
Others have modified the practice by issuing a statement to coincide with the secular New Year holiday.

In the Soviet Union, the first New Year broadcast was delivered on radio by Mikhail Kalinin, then the head of state, in 1941. With the expansion of linear broadcasting, a tradition was subsequently established of the leader at the time making a televised speech before the transition to the new year at midnight, starting with general secretary Leonid Brezhnev at the end of 1971, and continuing with Mikhail Gorbachev starting from 1985. In addition, beginning in 1986, Gorbachev and United States president Ronald Reagan exchanged televised New Year's Day addresses to the other's respective nations. This exchange continued between US president George H. W. Bush and Gorbachev until the dissolution of the Soviet Union. The practice of making a televised address on New Year's Eve was continued by leaders of the post-Soviet states, notably the presidents of Russia, Ukraine and Belarus. Since 2020, Belarusian opposition leader Sviatlana Tsikhanouskaya has also distributed New Year speeches on YouTube.

Broadcasts have been issued by the monarch of Denmark on radio since 1941, and on television since 1958, traditionally at 6 pm local time. Likewise, the Danish prime minister has addressed the nation on every New Year's Day since 1941. The prime minister of the United Kingdom issues a greeting on New Year's Day, as does the Archbishop of Canterbury, the spiritual leader of the Anglican Communion.

In post-war Germany, the annual New Year broadcast was delivered by the president from 1949 until 1969, and by the chancellor from 1970 onwards. The president of Italy has likewise done so since 1949. The president of France has addressed the nation on every New Year's Eve since 1959. Their speech is usually prerecorded around two hours before broadcast, with the only exception being in 2007, when it was broadcast live. The address by the president of Hungary is traditionally given on the morning of New Year's Day, with the exception of Tamás Sulyok's tenure, when it was moved to Christmas from 2024 and 2025.

In North Korea, New Year speeches by the supreme leader were televised on Korean Central Television under president Kim Il Sung, and from 2012 to 2018 under Kim Jong Un. King Vajiralongkorn of Thailand began issuing speeches on New Year's Eve following his accession in 2016; his predecessor, King Bhumibol Adulyadej, previously did so on his birthday.

Other leaders who have adopted this tradition include:

- the presidents of Austria, Cameroon, China, the Czech Republic, Finland, Iceland, Ivory Coast, Mongolia, the Philippines, Poland, Portugal, Senegal, Switzerland, and Turkey;
- the monarchs of Brunei, Japan, Monaco, and Norway;
- the governors-general of Canada, Jamaica, and New Zealand;
- the prime ministers of Australia, Iceland, and Malaysia.

In some cases, the head of state may also send a greeting at the Lunar New Year; this is done so by the President of the Philippines and the President of Indonesia.

=== Other ===
In Singapore, the Prime Minister addresses the nation on the country's national day, as does the Prime Minister of Malaysia, and the President of the Swiss Confederation. The Emperor of Japan makes a short address on his birthday, in addition to the New Year.

The king of Morocco makes speeches on the anniversary of his accession (Throne Day). The practice was formerly also conducted on the anniversaries of the Revolution of the King and the People and the Green March, but these were annulled by royal decree in November 2025.

In some cases, the head of state, usually a monarch, may deliver a speech from the throne at the opening of an annual legislative session. Alternatively, a president may deliver an annual oral report to the legislature; examples include the State of the Union in the United States, the State of the Nation in South Africa and Ghana, and the Presidential Address to the Federal Assembly in Russia. The Hispanic American equivalent to either is known as the mensaje a la nación (message to the nation).

== Impact ==
Boris Yeltsin's final New Year address in 1999, in which he announced his resignation as president of Russia

Leaders have used their annual speeches to announce major policy decisions or disclose their own political opinions. In 2023, king Mohammed VI of Morocco announced an initiative to link the countries of the Sahel with the Atlantic coast in his address coinciding with the anniversary of the Green March. At the end of 2024, presidents Alassane Ouattara and Bassirou Diomaye Faye announced the withdrawal of French forces or military bases from their respective countries during their New Year's addresses, coming as part of the wider French military withdrawal from West Africa. In his final New Year's address that same day, Polish president Andrzej Duda, a member of Law and Justice, criticized the policies of the third cabinet of prime minister Donald Tusk, which was drawn from an opposition coalition.

In some cases, heads of state also used annual speeches to announce their resignation or abdication. They include Grand Dukes Jean and Henri of Luxembourg and Queen Margrethe II of Denmark, who first publicly announced their respective abdications in their Christmas or New Year's Eve messages. Russian president Boris Yeltsin resigned shortly after delivering his New Year address at the end of 1999, paving the way for prime minister Vladimir Putin to ascend to power. Alternatively, they may also publicly decline re-election for an additional term; this was the case for Icelandic presidents Ólafur Ragnar Grímsson and Guðni Th. Jóhannesson.

In popular culture, speeches have been the subject of satirical parodies, as was the case for French presidents and kings of Spain.

== See also ==
- Speech from the throne
- State of the Nation § Speeches made by a head of state to the legislature
  - State of the Union (European Union)
  - State of the State address
- Cadena nacional
