= Government policy statement =

Announcement of government priorities

A government policy statement is a declaration of a government's political activities, plans and intentions relating to a concrete cause or, at the assumption of office, an entire legislative session. In certain countries they are announced by the head of government or a minister of the parliament. In constitutional monarchies, this function may be fulfilled by the Speech from the Throne.

In Germany and Austria, the Chancellor submits a government policy statement (Regierungserklärung) at the beginning of the session of the Bundestag (in Austria: Nationalrat), in which they announce the intended policies of the government during the next legislative session. The statement is not legally binding, but is a significant constitutional commitment for the parliament and the government. During the legislative period the federal government, through the Chancellor and the ministers, can give statements to the parliament through the chancellor or the ministers concerning current political themes. It cannot however be obliged to give such statements.

In Belgium, the federal government holds its policy statement (Beleidsverklaring) on the second Wednesday in October; its northern region of Flanders states its September Declaration (Septemberverklaring) on the fourth Monday of September. In the Netherlands, every third Tuesday in September is Prinsjesdag: the king holds the Speech from the throne (Troonrede) and the government will state its policy and budget plans in the Budget Memorandum (Miljoenennota) for the next year. When a new government coalition has been formed after elections, the Prime Minister will make a similar statement (Regeringsverklaring) for the four year legislative period it intends to run the country.

In Sweden, the Prime Minister holds the government's statement (Regeringsförklaring) at the start of their government's legislative session and at the start of each parliamentary year.

== See also ==
- State of the Nation
- State of the State address
- Speech from the throne
