= 2023 Moscow rally =

Rally and concent that took place in February 2023 at Luzhniki

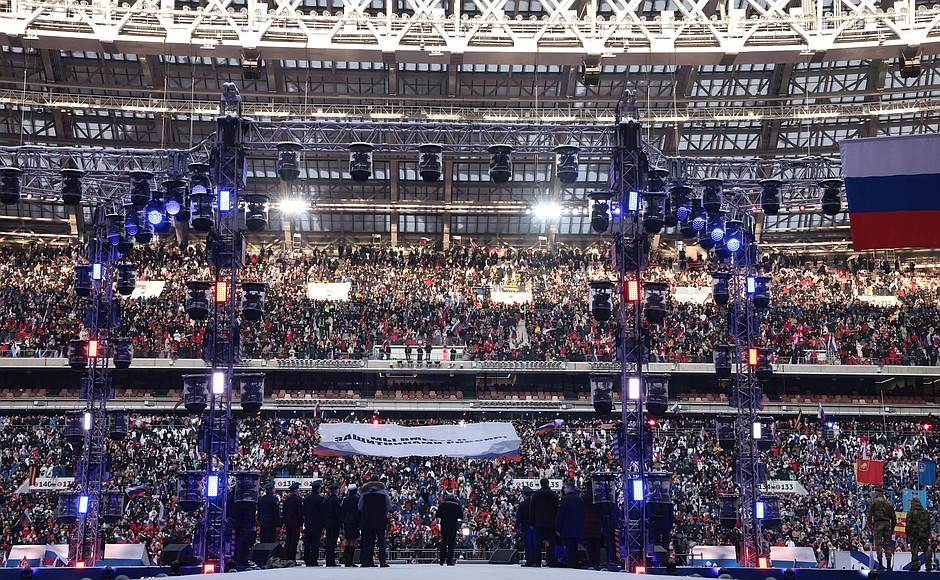
- Date: 22 February 2023 (3 years ago)
- Venue: Luzhniki Stadium
- Location: Moscow, Russia; 55.716°N 37.554°E
- Type: Concert and rally

A concert and rally took place on 22 February 2023 at Luzhniki Stadium in Moscow. TASS reported that the rally commemorated Defender of the Fatherland Day. Ukrainska Pravda stated that the date was selected in reference to the starting date of the Russian invasion of Ukraine, 24 February 2022.

RBC reported that President Vladimir Putin was expected to make an appearance, and RIA Novosti reported that a parliamentary source stated that Putin would speak at the rally. Ukrainska Pravda added that historical exhibits and Russian military equipment would also be on display. Argumenty i Fakty reported that around 200,000 people were expected to attend. Radio Liberty stated that people were being offered 500 RUB to attend a rally in Moscow, and presumed that the offer was for this rally. (Note: Radio Liberty stated that the offer was for a rally occurring on the anniversary of Russia's recognition of the Donetsk People's Republic and Luhansk People's Republic as independent states. DOXA also reported that people were being offered 500 RUB to attend a rally, and compared it to the 1500 RUB people were offered to attend the 2022 Moscow rally.) The Moscow Times stated that it had been reported that employees and students of Moscow Polytechnic University were ordered to attend and, if possible, to bring friends and family.

The Russian constitution requires the president to address the Federal Assembly annually. At the time the rally was scheduled, the last address Putin had delivered to the Federal Assembly was on 21 April 2021. (Note: TASS reported that Putin stated that there was no address in 2022 "because the situation was unfolding very quickly and it was difficult 'to fix the results at a specific point, as well as specific plans for the near future.'") Putin is scheduled to address the assembly at Gostiny Dvor on 21 February 2023, the day before the rally. RBC reported that the rally can be interpreted as an extension to the address.

== See also ==
- 2022 Moscow rally
- Government-organized demonstration
