= Certified Capital Company =

Type of company

Certified Capital Companies ("CAPCOs") are generally debt lending-based programs that employ future state tax credits as a subsidy to these funds. CAPCOs have been operated in the District of Columbia and eight states, including: Alabama, Colorado, Florida, Louisiana, Missouri, New York, Texas, and Wisconsin. Generally, CAPCOs sponsor their specific programs in states through legislation with the claims of economic development, job creation and retention, and certain instances, investment in specific sectors (e.g. high tech).

== Structure ==
Through CAPCO-sponsored legislation, states gives state taxpayer funds a tax credit match, usually on a dollar-for-dollar basis, on the amount of capital the CAPCO funds raise from insurance companies and lend to small business investment during a pre-specified time frame. The tax credit granted is an insurance premium tax credit, allowing insurance companies to reduce their tax liability in the state by one dollar for each dollar in tax credit obtained. This structure was adopted to incentivize insurance companies, which hold significant investible capital, but which are not required under the Community Reinvestment Act, to invest in local business, to invest in CAPCO funds, which then invest in small business. States have the authority to both regulate and tax insurance companies.

== Criticisms ==
CAPCO programs have been widely criticized as inefficient and ineffective for their stated purposes. The majority of states that have experimented with the model have allowed their programs to sunset and rejected new legislation designed to extend them. Multiple state audit reports have contradicted job creation claims by proponents.

Colorado - In a letter published as an appendix to an October 2003 state audit report, Colorado's director of economic development, F. Robert Lee, wrote: "We believe that the current CAPCO structure is far too expensive. Upon completion of the first phase, this program will cost the General Fund and the taxpayers of this state $100 million. Yet, of that amount, only about $40 million will initially be available for investment in Colorado businesses. The CAPCOs have argued that the defeasance structure and guaranty insurance are necessary in order to attract investment from insurance companies. We respectfully disagree. These are monies that the participating insurance companies owe the State of Colorado. There is no reason to guarantee their investments. They should not profit at the expense of small businesses; these taxes would have been owed anyway." Three months later in his annual State of the State address, Governor Bill Owens criticized the program and called for its termination: "By any measure the CAPCO program has failed. The state auditor’s recent report on the program is very compelling. Fact: the insurance companies collected nearly $1 million more in fees than they invested in venture capital. Fact: the state auditor could not verify the CAPCO companies’ claims about the alleged number of jobs created. Fact: Nearly half a million in taxpayer money went to lobbying fees. I guess that at least supports 'job retention.' Friends, all of us here are for economic development. But what separates us from the CAPCO advocates is that we want economic development for Colorado. We want new jobs and new companies on the West Slope, not the West Side of Manhattan. We want innovation in the Tech Center, not Rockefeller Center. We can’t mend this program. We must end this program."

Florida - In 2003, Governor Jeb Bush refused to allocate a 2nd tranche of $75 million of tax credits after initial reports indicated the 30 companies receiving CAPCO investments had reduced their headcounts by a net 174 jobs. Lobbyists for program proponents allegedly threatened a lawsuit to force the state to allocate additional tax credits to the program. State CFO Tom Gallagher was quoted in the Palm Beach Post as saying, "I think it's terrible public policy."

Missouri - In July 2004, State Auditor Claire McCaskill issued an audit report stating, "We concluded the Missouri Certified Capital Company Tax Credit program is an inefficient and ineffective tax credit program." Among other findings, the audit report projected that the CAPCO program would yield incremental tax revenues of less than 17 cents for every dollar of tax credits committed. "The CAPCO program will use $140 million in tax credits while only generating $23.6 million in projected revenues and creating an average projected 293 jobs for 15 years. This results in a net reduction in state revenue of $116.4 million over the life of the program."

Texas - In 2009 and 2011, proponents failed legislative efforts to add $200 million of tax credits to the $400 million previously committed. Lt. Governor David Dewhurst effectively halted the effort in 2011 when he noted that the cost of the program per job created exceeded that of any other state job creation project except for local school property tax breaks. "The fiscal cost of the CAPCO program is real," said Mike Walz, Dewhurst's communications director. "The lieutenant governor believes that before the state spends another $200 million on a third program, we should extensively analyze whether the program has been effective, how we can make it more effective and what financial benefits the state of Texas has realized from its investment." The effort failed despite an intensive lobbying effort. In fact, Texans for Public Justice reported that CAPCO proponents had spent more than $1 million lobbying for legislation from 2001 to 2011.

Wisconsin - In 2011, CAPCO proponents championed legislation that would commit $200 million of tax credits, claiming "success" from the $50 million CAPCO program established in 1998. State Senator Glenn Grothman, who voted in favor of the program in 1998, led the opposition to the new initiative. “I think if you were selling such an investment (as the CAPCO proposal) to little old ladies, and giving them such a bad deal, you should go to prison. I don’t know if you can go to prison for bilking gullible legislators.” Reporters Kathleen Gallagher and Mark Johnson of the Milwaukee Journal-Sentinel investigated proponent claims of job creation from the 1998 program and concluded that $50 million had "netted just 202 new jobs for Wisconsin, at a cost of more than $247,000 per job." They also reported that one of the three CAPCO funds had taken advantage of the poorly written legislation. "Rather than channel all of the $16.6 million into growing state companies, as lawmakers had intended, Wilshire Investors LLC invested just $8.6 million - plowing much of that money into companies that either failed or fed the growth of its own parent company, Newtek Business Services Inc., according to state records and federal securities filings." Governor Scott Walker, initially a champion of the plan, withdrew his support in favor of non-CAPCO venture capital program models.

== Legislative history ==
CAPCOs were first implemented in the State of Louisiana in the 1980s. Initially, the Louisiana Program authorized a two dollar tax credit match for each dollar in capital invested.

| State | Year established | Credits authorized | Credits allocated |
|---|---|---|---|
| Alabama | 2003 | $200,000,000 | $200,000,000 |
| Colorado | 2001 | $200,000,000 | $100,000,000 |
| District of Columbia | 2003 | $50,000,000 | $50,000,000 |
| Florida | 1998 | $150,000,000 | $100,000,000 |
| Louisiana | 1983 | $636,500,000 | $636,500,000 |
| Missouri | 1996 | $140,000,000 | $140,000,000 |
| New York | 1997 | $400,000,000 | $400,000,000 |
| Texas | 2003 | $400,000,000 | $400,000,000 |
| Wisconsin | 1998 | $50,000,000 | $50,000,000 |
| | Total | $2,226,500,000 | $2,076,500,000 |
