= 2023 Presidential Address to the Federal Assembly =

Putin announces New START's suspension

Presidential Address to the Federal Assembly
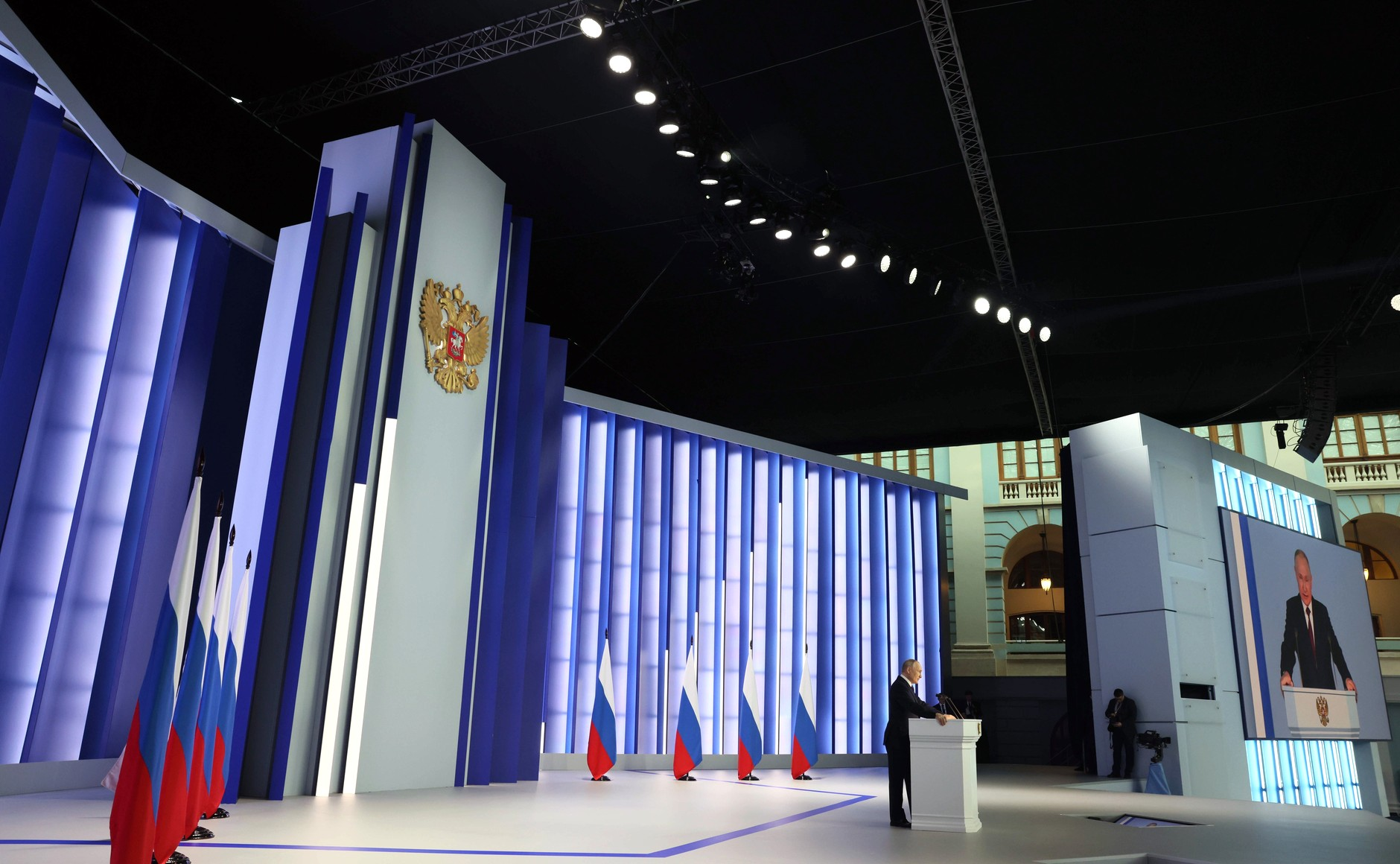
- Vladimir Putin delivering the speech at Moscow's Gostiny Dvor
- Native name: Послание президента Федеральному собранию
- Date: 21 February 2023 (3 years ago)
- Time: 12:05 MSK (09:05 UTC)
- Duration: 105 minutes
- Venue: Gostiny Dvor
- Location: Moscow, Russia; 55.7540°N 37.6255°E
- Type: Presidential Address to the Federal Assembly
- Participants: Vladimir Putin

External media

Images
- Television display in Luhansk
- Screen on Volgograd business center
- Digital billboard in Sevastopol
- Display on Leninsky Prospekt, Moscow

Video
- The speech, in its entirety (in Russian)

On 21 February 2023, almost a year after Russia launched a full-scale invasion of Ukraine, Russian President Vladimir Putin delivered an address to the Federal Assembly, at Gostiny Dvor in Moscow, Russia. This was the first Presidential Address to the Federal Assembly since the start of the invasion; Putin did not deliver such an address in 2022. (Note: The Russian constitution requires the president to address the Federal Assembly annually. TASS reported that Putin stated that there was no address in 2022 "because the situation was unfolding very quickly and it was difficult 'to fix the results at a specific point, as well as specific plans for the near future.'")

== Overview ==
During the address, Putin asserted that the West had started the war, and that Russia had been using force to end it. He stated that the Ukrainian people were hostages of the Ukrainian government. Putin also said that the West had planned to turn a local conflict into a global one, and that the conflict represented an existential threat to Russia. He added that it was impossible to defeat Russia, and vowed to continue fighting in Ukraine. He also praised the people of Luhansk, Donetsk, Kherson, and Zaporizhzhia for the choice they made during the previous year's annexation referendums. Near the end of his speech, Putin announced that Russia would be suspending its participation in the nuclear disarmament treaty New START.

Putin's address was broadcast simultaneously on television and in schools and government buildings, as well as displayed on large screens in public places in Russia and the occupied territories of Ukraine. It was delivered a day after U.S. president Joe Biden made a surprise visit to Kyiv, his first to Ukraine since the start of the invasion. (Note: Russian officials were informed about the trip hours before it began.)

On the same day but after Putin's address, CNN reported that U.S. officials had stated that a test of the Sarmat, a Russian intercontinental ballistic missile, appeared to have failed shortly before the address. Initial reports suggested that the missile test had apparently occurred while Biden was in Ukraine, but a U.S. official later clarified that the test had occurred on 18 February 2023, three days before Putin's speech. Prior to the test, Russia had informed the U.S. of the intended missile launch, as required by New START. (Note: Russia had notified the U.S. of the missile test via deconfliction lines. The U.S. also used deconfliction lines to notify Russia of Biden's visit to Kyiv.) U.S. officials stated that such a test was considered routine, and not an escalation of the conflict. However, Putin did not mention the missile test during his speech.

On the same day, President Biden also delivered a speech in Warsaw, Poland, hours after Putin had made his presidential address. The following day, Putin made a brief appearance at a rally at Luzhniki Stadium in Moscow commemorating Defender of the Fatherland Day.

== Gallery ==
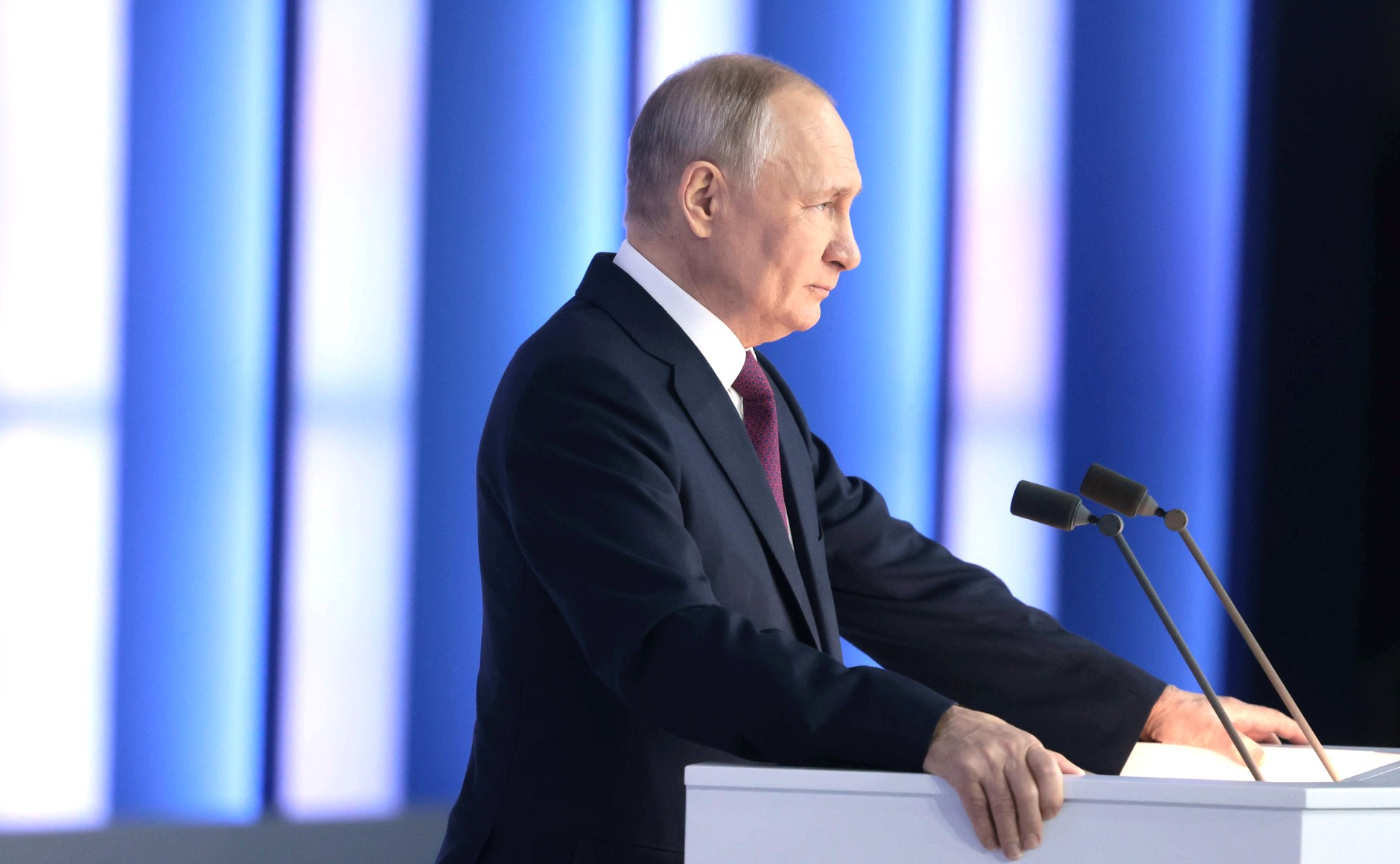

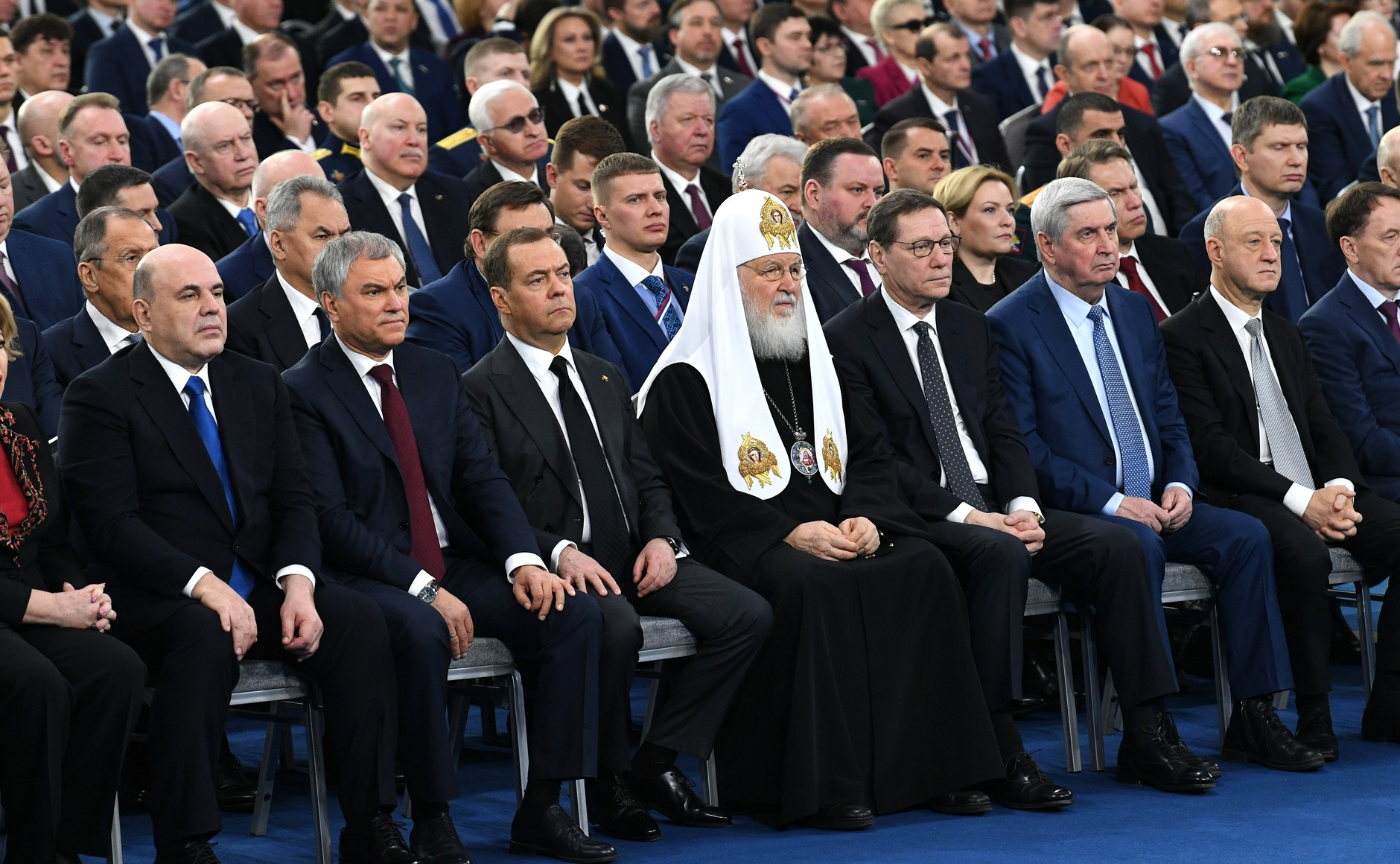

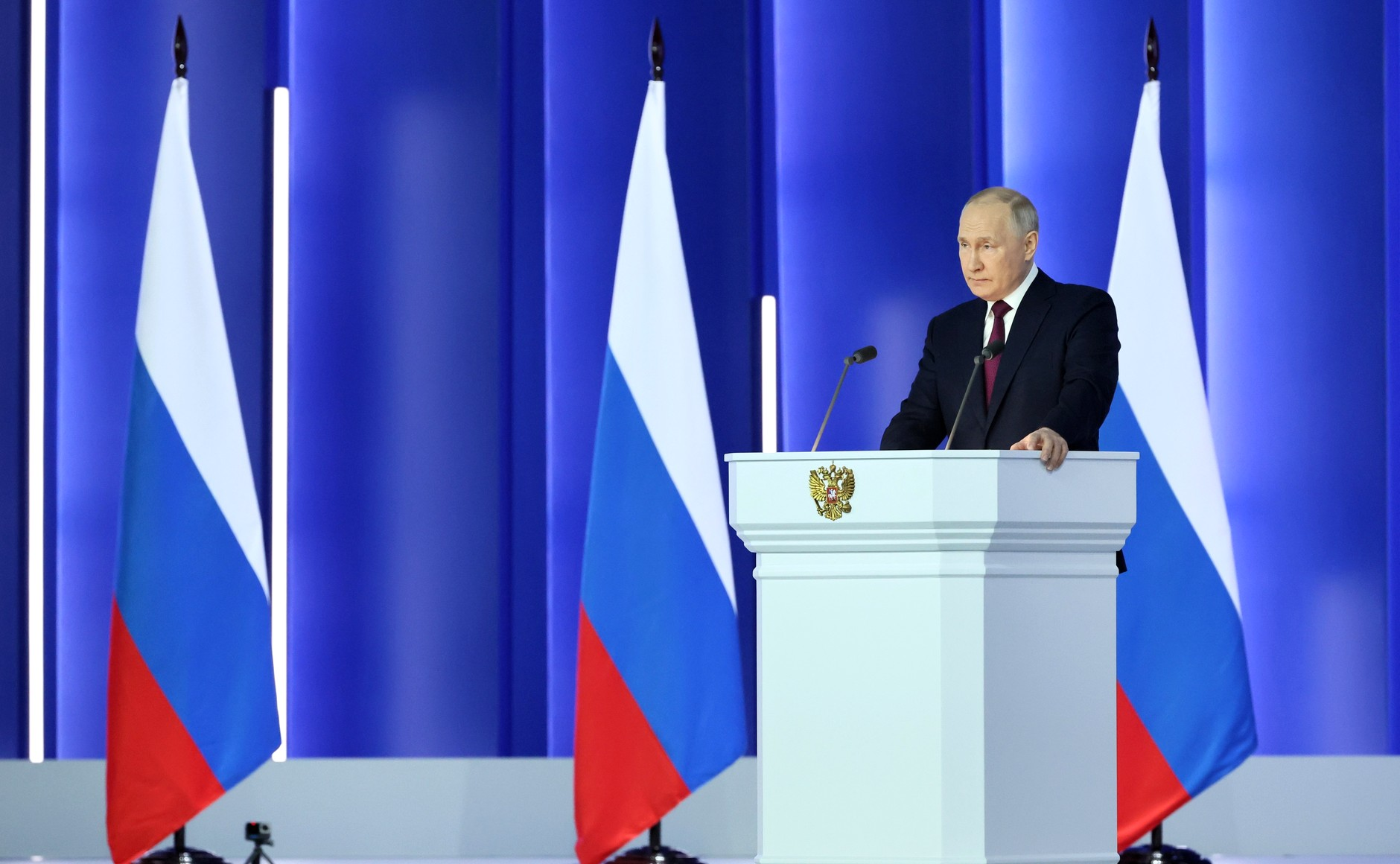

== See also ==
- Address concerning the events in Ukraine, delivered by Putin one year previously, to the day
