= State of the Union (disambiguation) =

The State of the Union is the name of an annual address (lecture) presented by the President of the United States of America to the United States Congress.

State of the Union may also refer to:

== Politics ==
- State of the Union (European Union), an annual speech addressed by the President of the European Commission
- The State of the Union (European University Institute), an annual forum for high level reflection on the European Union organised by the European University Institute (EUI)

== Arts, entertainment, and media ==
=== Films ===
- State of the Union (film), a 1948 film by Frank Capra
- XXX: State of the Union, a 2005 film by Lee Tamahori

=== Literature ===
- State of the Union (play), a 1946 play by Russel Crouse and Howard Lindsay
- State of the Union, a 2005 novel by Douglas Kennedy

=== Music ===
==== Groups ====
- State of the Union, a band on WTII Records
- State of the Union, a band featuring Brooks Williams and Boo Hewerdine

==== Works ====
- State of the Union (album), a Dischord Records various artists compilation
- "State of the Union" (song), a song by David Ford
- "State of the Union", a song on Siren Song of the Counter Culture, an album by punk band Rise Against

=== Television ===
- State of the Union (American TV program), an American TV news program/talk show that has aired on Sundays on CNN since 2009
- State of the Union (British TV series), a British television comedy (Series 1: 2019; Series 2: 2022)
- Tracey Ullman's State of the Union, a comedy sketch TV show

=== Other arts, entertainment, and media ===
- State of the Union, a Creators Syndicate comic

== Other uses ==
- Australian Provincial Championship or The State of the Union, a rugby union competition

== See also ==
- State of the Nation (disambiguation)
- State of the State address, similar address in US states
- Union State, a political union of Belarus and Russia
- State of the Onion
