= State of the Nation =

State of the Nation may refer to:

== Speeches made by a head of state to the legislature ==
=== State of the Nation ===
- State of the Nation Address (Belarus), a speech made annually by the President of Belarus to outline the state and condition in which Belarus is in to the Belarusian parliament
- State of the Nation (Somaliland), an annual speech to Parliament given by the President of the Republic of Somaliland
- State of the Nation (Luxembourg), a speech made annually by the Prime Minister of Luxembourg to the national legislature, the Chamber of Deputies
- State of the Nation (Russia), a speech made annually by the Russian President to outline the state and condition in which Russia is in to the Federal Assembly
- State of the Nation Address (Philippines), an annual address by the President of the Philippines to the Congress of the Philippines
- State of the Nation Address (South Africa), an annual event in the Republic of South Africa, in which the President of South Africa reports on the status of the nation
- State of the Nation (Ghana), an annual address to Parliament given by the President of the republic of Ghana covering economic, social, and financial state of the country according to Article 67 of the country's constitution.

=== Similar titles ===
- Speech from the throne, in monarchies
- September Declaration (Septemberverklaring), Flanders
- Neujahrsansprache (New Year's speech), a speech by the President of the Swiss Confederation in front of the Lötschberg Base Tunnel (Lötschbergbasistunnel)
- The Speech from the throne (Troonrede) on Prinsjesdag or Prince's Day, the Netherlands
- State Opening of Parliament, for the United Kingdom
- State of the Union, United States
- State of the State address, a speech customarily given once each year by the governors of most states of the United States
- Policy address of Hong Kong

== Film ==
- State of the Nation: Austria in Six Chapters, a 2002 Austrian documentary directed by Michael Glawogger

== Television ==
- State of the Nation (TV series), a series of investigative journalism programmes made by Granada Television from 1966 until 1988
- State of the Nation (Philippine TV program), a news program broadcast on GTV

== Music ==
- "State of the Nation" (Industry song), a 1984 song by Industry
- "State of the Nation" (New Order song), a 1986 song by New Order
- State of the Nation (EP), an EP by The Generators
- "State of the Nation", a 1980 song by Fad Gadget from the album Fireside Favourites

== See also ==
- State of the Union (disambiguation)
