= State of the City address =

Annual address regarding a city

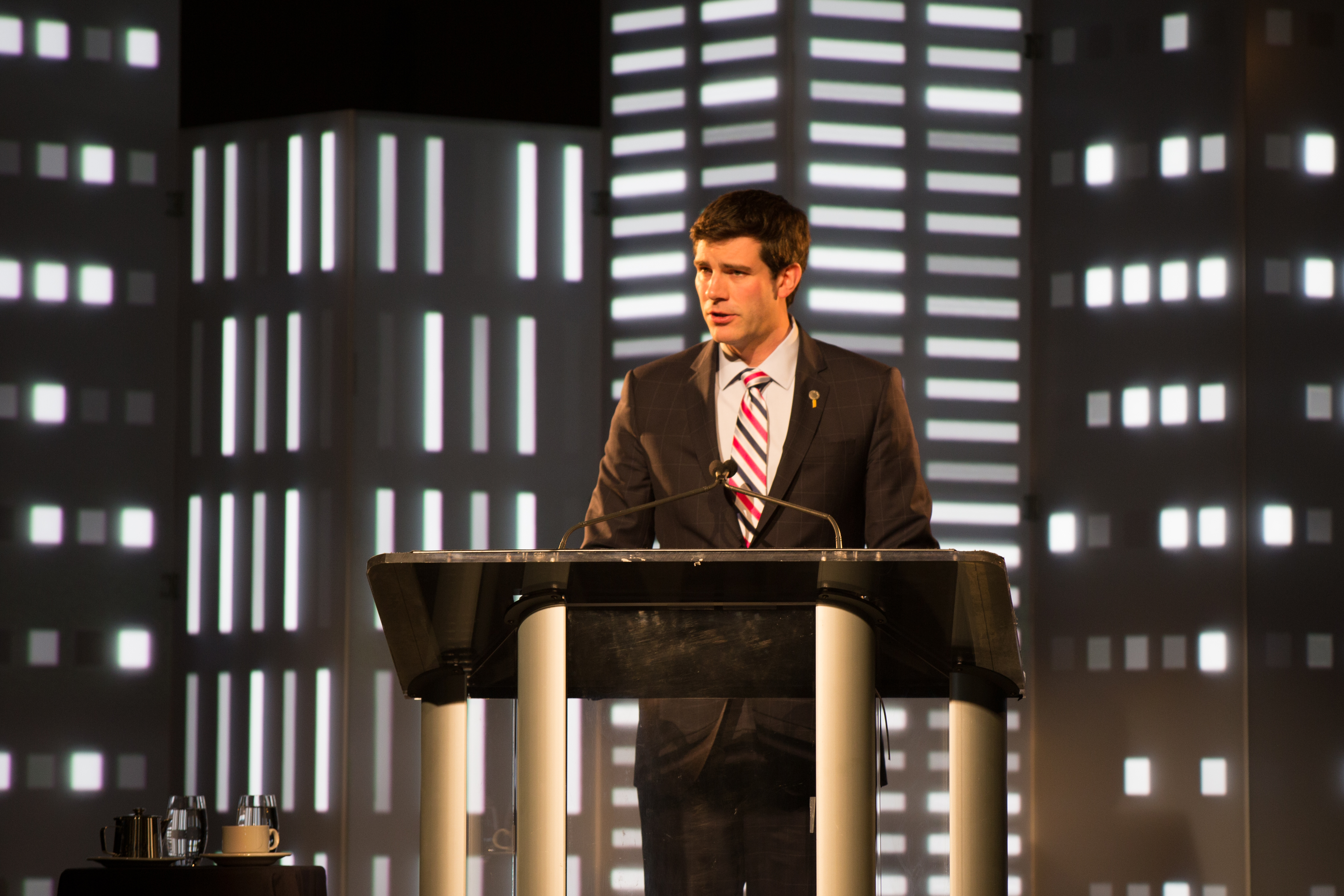
Mayor Don Iveson delivering the 2015 Edmonton State of the City address.

The State of the City address is an annual speech customarily delivered by the mayors or city managers of many cities in Canada and the United States. The term is modeled on the analogous addresses given by the president of the United States (called the State of the Union address) and the by a governor of a U.S. state (known as the State of the State address). The mayor of the District of Columbia gives a State of the District address. The Address is usually used to outline the mayor's legislative proposals and policy directions for the upcoming year.

The timing, venue and purpose of a State of the City Address can vary significantly depending on local history and practice. Most State of the City Addresses are held early in the calendar year, but some mayors deliver their address as late as December of each year. In many American and Canadian cities, by law or tradition, the State of the City Address is delivered to the city council of the city. The presentation may be given at the invitation of members of a local business organization or a prominent local charity.

== Adoption outside of the United States ==
=== Canada ===
Many cities in Canada deliver an annual State of the City Address. Since Canadian provincial and territorial legislatures, as well as the Parliament of Canada, begin legislative sessions with a Speech from the Throne delivered on the government's behalf by the Lieutenant Governor or the Governor General of Canada, there is no formal direct equivalent for an annual address from either the federal government or regional governments in the Canadian system. However, on occasion, local business organizations have invited their province's Premier to deliver a State of the Province Address.

=== South Africa ===
The Executive Mayor of Johannesburg has delivered a State of the City Address since 2002.

=== The Philippines ===
They are commonly called as State of the City Address (SOCA) or State of the Municipality Address (SOMA) in the Philippines.
