= State of the Nation Address (Belarus) =

The State of the Union Address (Belarusian:Зварот Прэзідэнта Рэспублікі Беларусь з пасланнем да беларускага народа і Нацыянальнага сходу Рэспублікі Беларусь, Zvarot Prezidenta Respubłiki Bjełaruś z pasłanniem da biełaruskaga naroda i Nacyjanalnaga schodu Respubłiki Bjełaruś) is an annual message delivered by the Belarusian President to a joint meeting of the two houses of the Belarusian Parliament: the House of Representatives and the Council of the Republic.

It is similar to the State of the Union given by the President of the United States.

== See also ==
- Government policy statement
- State of the Nation (disambiguation), for addresses by heads of state
- Speech from the throne
