= New Year address by the President of Russia =

The New Year address by the President of Russia (Russian: Новогоднее обращение президента Российской Федерации) is a traditional speech given in Russia by the president to the citizens, and generally broadcast on Russian television.

== History ==
Boris Yeltsin's 1999 New Year address in which he announced his resignation

Vladimir Putin's 1999 New Year address as an acting President

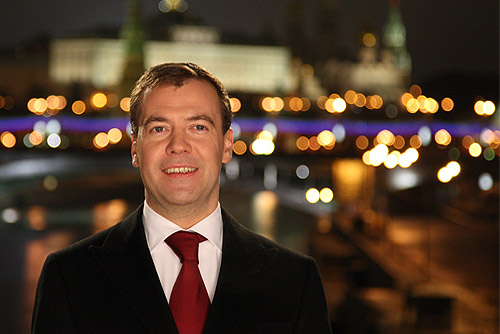
Dmitry Medvedev's 2008 New Year address

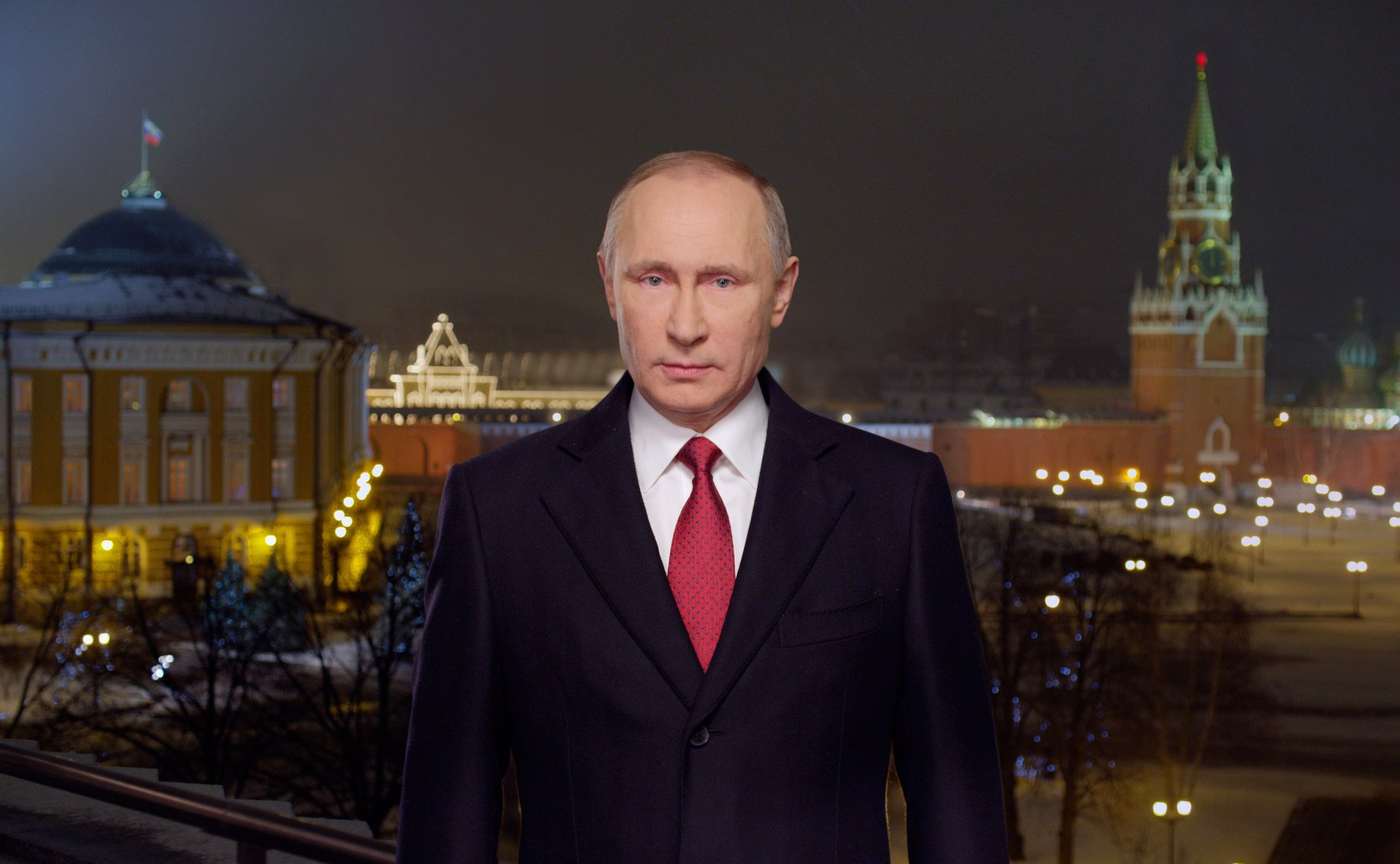
Vladimir Putin's 2017 New Year address

In Russia, tuning in before midnight to watch the President's speech (Russian: новогодние обращения) has become traditional. The president gives the New Year speech from the Kremlin, a few minutes before the Kremlin Clock chimes at midnight followed by the performance of the national anthem of Russia. The speech sums up the main events of the year and discusses prospects for the coming one. The tradition is observed by most Russians, regardless of political views.

The speech is broadcast in each of the 11 time zones in the country. Because of that, the video of the speech is already available on the internet to audiences in western Russia during the afternoon of 31 December.

The tradition dates back to 1941, when the Soviet government broadcast a speech about the state of the country during World War II. Gorbachev gave a speech in 1990 saying the 1990s would be "a decade of the drawing of the United States and the Soviet Union closer together".

Boris Yeltsin generally avoided talk of politics during his new year speeches, preferring to talk about family values and the holiday spirit, though he did use his 1996 speech to promote economic reforms. Yeltsin famously resigned during his New Year speech on 31 December 1999. In 2013, two different speeches were broadcast: the first one was only broadcast in the Far East, while a new broadcast for the rest of the country mentioned the December 2013 Volgograd bombings.

Vladimir Putin's address on December 31, 2020 was the longest of all time - it lasted 6 minutes (not including the chimes and the anthem). On December 31, 2021, this record was broken again - the circulation lasted 6 minutes and 22 seconds. On December 31, 2022, Putin read out his New Year’s address against a backdrop of members of the Russian military; he mentioned the “protection of our people in the new regions of the Russian Federation” and the address lasted 9 minutes. One of the servicemen who was standing behind Putin during the address was later killed while fighting in Ukraine in February 2023.

== See also ==
- Annual speeches by heads of state and government
