= Federal Chancellor =

Bundeskanzler or Bundeskanzlerin (German for "Federal Chancellor"), and the shortened form Kanzler or Kanzlerin may refer to:

- Federal Chancellor of Germany, the head of the German federal government
- Federal Chancellor of Austria, the head of the Austrian federal government
- Federal Chancellor of Switzerland, a Swiss federal government official
- The head of the government of the North German Confederation (1866–1871)
