= September Declaration =

Annual government policy statement of Flanders

The September Declaration (Dutch: Septemberverklaring) is the annual government policy statement of Flanders in the form of a speech by the Minister-President of Flanders to the members of the Flemish Parliament. The Declaration, drafted by the Flemish Government, informs Parliament (and citizens) about the general state of Flemish society, and the main policy and budget plans for the next year.

The September Declaration is held annually on the fourth Monday in September, which is where its name comes from. The speech is more or less comparable to the Speech from the Throne in the Netherlands or the State of the Union in the United States. A more elaborate discussion of the plans commences the next Wednesday.

The Policy Statement (Dutch: Beleidsverklaring) in the Belgian Federal Parliament by the federal government is held about two weeks later, on the second Wednesday in October.
