= Presidential Address to the Federal Assembly =

Annual speech by the Russian president

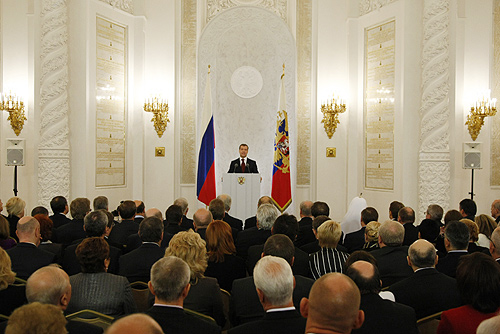
2008 Presidential Address to the Federal Assembly given by President Dmitry Medvedev

The annual Presidential Address to the Federal Assembly (Russian: Послание Президента России Федеральному собранию) is a speech given by the Russian president to outline the state and condition in which Russia is in. It is given in front of a joint meeting of the two houses of the Russian Parliament: the State Duma and Federation Council. Article 84 of the current Constitution of Russia enacted in 1993 says "The President of the Russian Federation shall: address the Federal Assembly with annual messages on the situation in the country, on the guidelines of the internal and foreign policy of the State". First Russian president Boris Yeltsin delivered the first Address to the Federal Assembly on 24 February 1994. The date of the presidential address is not fixed.

In addition to the State Duma Deputies and Senators, in his address as there are Members of the Government, Supreme and Constitutional Courts; public and religious figures and heads of Federal subjects.

== History ==
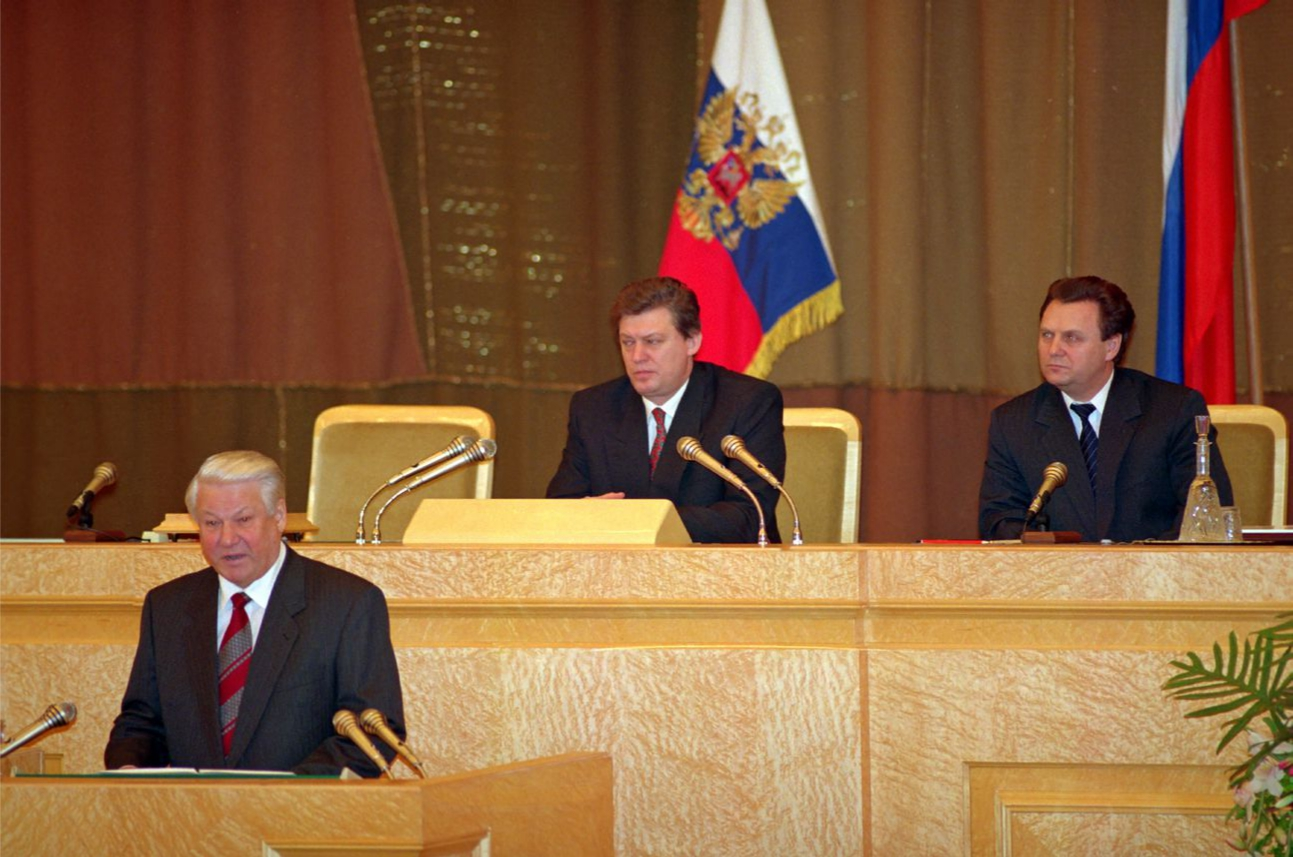
President Boris Yeltsin with Chairman of the Federation Council Vladimir Shumeyko and Chairman of the State Duma Ivan Rybkin during the 1995 Presidential Address to the Federal Assembly

In the Soviet Union, prior to the institution of the post of President of the Soviet Union, such messages were not known, but their role in the political sense was played by regular Reports of the Central Committee of the Communist Party of the Soviet Union to a Congress of the CPSU.

After the presidency of the Soviet Union was established in March 1990, the amended Constitution stipulated that the USSR President "... shall deliver to the Congress of People's Deputies annual reports on the situation of the country, inform the Supreme Soviet of the most important issues of domestic and foreign policy of the Soviet Union". However, no such reports were ever delivered due to the fact that the USSR president Mikhail Gorbachev had too short time in the presidential office. Nevertheless, Gorbachev gave on 31 March 1990 with a message to the Supreme Soviet of the USSR on family issues and on 13 April that year to the Supreme Soviet of the Lithuanian SSR and the Council of Ministers of the Lithuanian SSR, which pointed out the unacceptability of a situation in which "... the republic's leadership makes all new legislative acts and decisions, which contrasted with the Lithuanian SSR and other republics of the Soviet Union as a whole ".

In the Russian Federation, the provision that the head of state addresses the highest legislative body first appeared in the Law of the RSFSR of 24 April 1991 "On the President of the RSFSR," under paragraph 3 of Article 5 of which the President "... shall at least once a year deliver a report to the Congress of People's Deputies on the implementation of socio-economic and other programs adopted by the Congress of People's Deputies of the RSFSR and the Supreme Soviet of the RSFSR, on the situation in the RSFSR, give messages to the people of the RSFSR, the Congress of People's Deputies of the RSFSR, and Supreme Soviet of the RSFSR. The Congress of People's Deputies of the RSFSR by a majority votes of the People's Deputies shall have the right to request from the President of the RSFSR an extraordinary report ".

Prior to the adoption of the Constitution of Russia in December 1993, Russian president Boris Yeltsin addressed directly the people of Russia on several occasions. Specifically, on 10 December 1992 speaking at the VII Congress of People's Deputies, he appealed to citizens to collect signatures for the initiative to hold a popular vote of confidence in the president; on 20 March 1993, he gave a televised address to the nation, in which he called the nationwide referendum for 25 April that year.

After the adoption of the Constitution of the Russian Federation in 1993, presidential addresses to the Parliament became an annual fixture. The first such message was read out on 24 February 1994.

Initially, there was a tradition to give each appeal its own title, for example: "On strengthening the Russian state" in 1994 or "What kind of Russia we are building" in 2000. However, since 2003 messages have ceased to be given specific names.

Initially, the Presidential Address to the Federal Assembly was held in the Marble Hall of the 14th building of the Kremlin. In 2008, President Dmitry Medvedev moved the Appeal in the St. George Hall of the Grand Kremlin Palace. Also, until 2008, the chairmen of the Chambers of the Federal Assembly sat at the podium behind the president, emulating American practice for the analogous State of the Union address. Since 2008, the Chairmen of the Chambers now sit among Members of the Federal Assembly.

No address was held in 2017, due to it being postponed to early 2018. It was the first time a presidential address was not given during the year since its introduction.

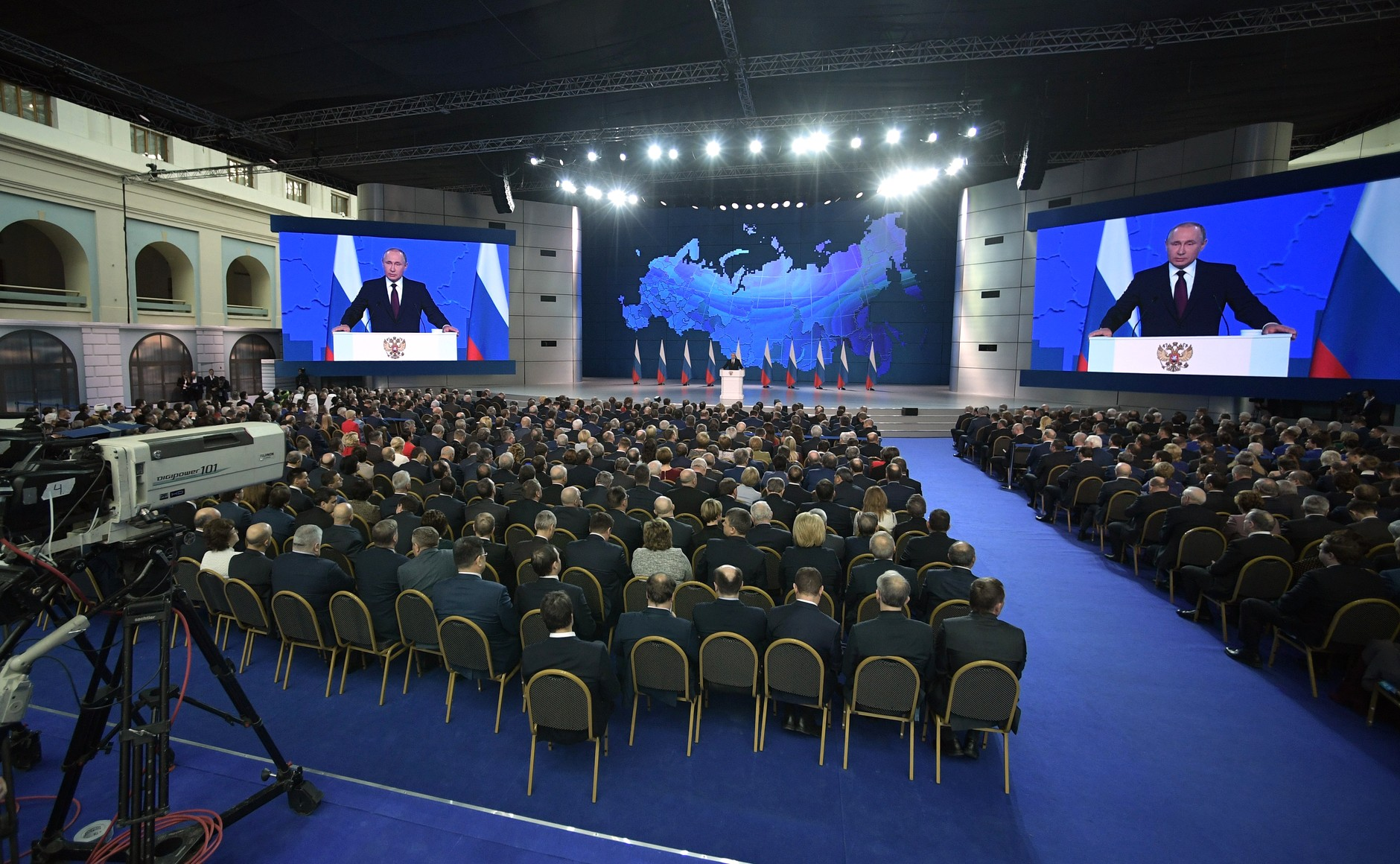
2019 Presidential Address to the Federal Assembly given by President Vladimir Putin

All messages since 2018 have been held outside the Kremlin. The 2018 address was held in the Manege. This was due to the increasing number of participants and the need to use infographics. In 2019, the message was held at the Gostiny Dvor.

Due to the implications of the ongoing Russian invasion of Ukraine, no presidential address was given in 2022. The official Russian news agency TASS reported that Putin explained he did not deliver an address in 2022 "because the situation was unfolding very quickly and it was difficult 'to fix the results at a specific point, as well as specific plans for the near future.'"

== Legal basis ==
From a legal perspective, neither the presidential address nor its contents become binding. Nor does law provide for a form of response to the presidential address on the part of the Federal Assembly.

By its nature, a presidential address could not be regarded as a legal document of the president, as the Constitution provides for only two types of instruments issued by the head of state, namely by decree, and executive order. At the same time, such address is an important political and policy document addressed, in fact, not only to Parliament but to all other authorities in the Russian Federation, to society as a whole. Therefore, they feature such messages as political acts with elements of the regulatory functions or as a regulatory and political form of the head of state.

Content and form of the address is at the discretion of the President and are not regulated by any rules, except for the fact that the Federal Law of July 20, 1995 № 115-FZ "On State Forecasting and programs of socio-economic development of the Russian Federation" established the following requirement: "Annual Message of the President of the Russian Federation, with whom he addresses the Federal Assembly, shall contain a special section devoted to the analysis of the program of socio-economic development of Russia's medium-term and refinement of the program with the allocation of tasks for the coming year" (Part 2 items . 5). However, in practice this requirement is not met. House of the Federal Assembly on the results of the hearing of Presidential addresses often make special provisions for implementing the planned legislative activities in the messages.).

Federal executive bodies also respond to the message the head of state adoption of the relevant legal acts, which are set up to the task set by the President. Paragraph 2.1 of the Model Rules of the internal organization of the federal bodies of executive power, approved by the Government of the Russian Federation, provided that "the planning of the federal executive body for the main activities carried out on the basis of the Message of the President of the Russian Federation Federal Assembly, the Budget message of the President of the Russian Federation Federal Assembly ... ".

The subjects of the Russian Federation in the development of the provisions of the Message are also taking their regulations. All this testifies to the significant role played by the message of the president, not only politically but also in law-making process.

== List ==
No.	Date	President	Location	Title	Link
1st	February 24, 1994	Boris Yeltsin	14th building of the Kremlin	"On strengthening the Russian state"	
2nd	February 16, 1995	Boris Yeltsin	14th building of the Kremlin	"On the effectiveness of state power in Russia"	
3rd	February 23, 1996	Boris Yeltsin	14th building of the Kremlin	"Russia, for which we are responsible"	
4th	March 6, 1997	Boris Yeltsin	14th building of the Kremlin	"Order in power — order in the country"	
5th	February 17, 1998	Boris Yeltsin	14th building of the Kremlin	"Together — to the rise of Russia"	
6th	March 30, 1999	Boris Yeltsin	14th building of the Kremlin	"Russia at the turn of ages"	
7th	July 8, 2000	Vladimir Putin	14th building of the Kremlin	"What kind of Russia we are building"	
8th	April 3, 2001	Vladimir Putin	14th building of the Kremlin	"There will be no revolutions, no counter-revolutions"	
9th	April 18, 2002	Vladimir Putin	14th building of the Kremlin	"Russia needs to be strong and competitive"	
10th	May 16, 2003	Vladimir Putin	14th building of the Kremlin	None	
11th	May 26, 2004	Vladimir Putin	14th building of the Kremlin	None	
12th	April 25, 2005	Vladimir Putin	14th building of the Kremlin	None	
13th	May 10, 2006	Vladimir Putin	14th building of the Kremlin	None	
14th	April 26, 2007	Vladimir Putin	14th building of the Kremlin	None	
15th	November 5, 2008	Dmitry Medvedev	Grand Kremlin Palace	None	
16th	November 12, 2009	Dmitry Medvedev	Grand Kremlin Palace	None	
17th	November 30, 2010	Dmitry Medvedev	Grand Kremlin Palace	None	
18th	December 22, 2011	Dmitry Medvedev	Grand Kremlin Palace	None	
19th	December 12, 2012	Vladimir Putin	Grand Kremlin Palace	None	
20th	December 12, 2013	Vladimir Putin	Grand Kremlin Palace	None	
— (Note: The address was held in connection with the appeal of the Republic of Crimea and Sevastopol on admission to Russia. Officially called the Address to the Deputies of the State Duma and Members of the Federation Council, it is not considered an official annual Presidential Address to the Federal Assembly.)	March 18, 2014 (Extraordinary address)	Vladimir Putin	Grand Kremlin Palace	Crimean speech	
21st	December 4, 2014	Vladimir Putin	Grand Kremlin Palace	None	
22nd	December 3, 2015	Vladimir Putin	Grand Kremlin Palace	None	
23rd	December 1, 2016	Vladimir Putin	Grand Kremlin Palace	None	
24th	March 1, 2018	Vladimir Putin	Moscow Manege	None	
25th	February 20, 2019	Vladimir Putin	Moscow Gostiny Dvor	None	
26th	January 15, 2020	Vladimir Putin	Moscow Manege	None	
27th	April 21, 2021	Vladimir Putin	Moscow Manege	None	
28th	February 21, 2023	Vladimir Putin	Moscow Gostiny Dvor	None	
29th	February 29, 2024	Vladimir Putin	Moscow Gostiny Dvor	None	

== See also ==
- State of the Nation (disambiguation), for addresses by heads of state
- Speech from the throne
- State Opening of Parliament in the United Kingdom
- State of the Union Address in the United States
