= Government-organized demonstration =

Demonstrations which are organized by the government of that nation

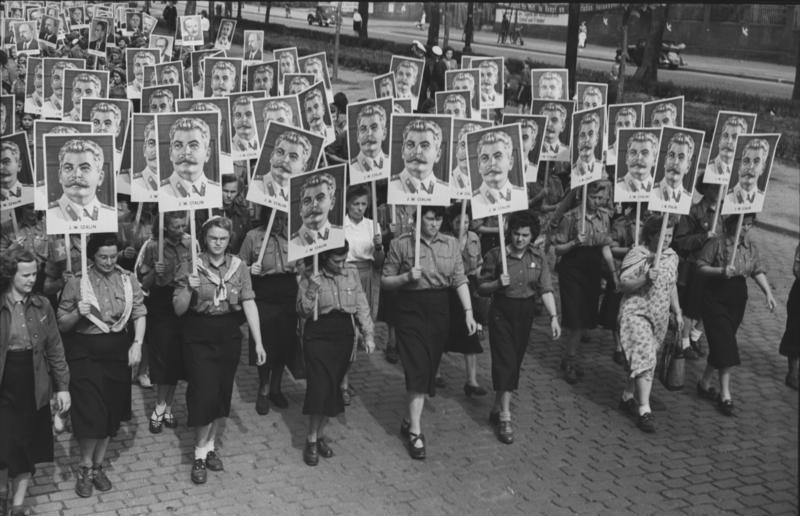
"Day of Young Women" on 9 August 1951 Friedrichshain during the 3rd World Festival of Youth and Students

Government-organized demonstrations or state demonstrations are demonstrations which are organized by the government of that nation.

== History ==
The Islamic Republic of Iran, the People's Republic of China, Republic of Cuba, Ba'athist Syria, Kirchnerist Argentina, the Soviet Union, Russia under Vladimir Putin, Fascist Italy, Nazi Germany, and the Empire of Japan among other nations, have had government-organized demonstrations.

In Iran, demonstrations such as the anniversary of Islamic revolution, are organized by government. In the past, people at these demonstrations have chanted "Down with Israel" and/or "Death to America".

The North Korean government regularly organizes demonstrations against South Korea or the United States or in support of government policies.

== Modern use ==
On 16 November 2013, amid protests against the Oresharski government in Bulgaria, the ruling Bulgarian Socialist Party organized a demonstration in support of their own governance, which had at the time the lowest-ever popularity amongst the Bulgarian population since the end of one-party rule.

A similar example happened in Poland on 13 December 2015 when Jarosław Kaczyński's party, Law and Justice, changed their annual unofficial celebrations of the anniversary of the introduction of the Martial Law into a pro-government rally to counterbalance a 50,000 strong "prodemocratic demonstration" organized by the Democracy Defence Committee, protesting against what they called the breaking of the constitution by Law and Justice' president Andrzej Duda and Beata Szydło's government.

During the Bolivarian Revolution, state employees in Venezuela have often been forced to participate in government-organized demonstrations or counter-demonstrations. After the arrest of Colombian businessman Alex Saab, who had close ties with the Nicolás Maduro administration and indicted with money laundering, the Venezuelan government organized a demonstration in support of Saab.

During the 2018–2020 protests in Serbia, Aleksandar Vučić, the president of Serbia and the ruling Serbian Progressive Party (SNS), launched a campaign titled "Future of Serbia" as response to the protests. Vučić and SNS again organised a demonstration in response to the 2023 Serbian protests.

In April 2026, the Cuban government supported a demonstration in Havana protesting the U.S. embargo and the Trump administration's expanded economic pressure on Cuba. The demonstration, organized by the Federation of Cuban Women, was attended by senior Cuban officials and called for an end to the U.S. energy blockade and other sanctions.

== See also ==
- Compelled speech
- Controlled opposition
- Mass games
- Sham election
- Social control
