= State of the Nation (Ghana) =

The State of the Nation address (sometimes abbreviated to SONA) is an annual address to Parliament given by the President of the republic of Ghana covering economic, social, and financial state of the country according to Article 67 of the 1992 constitution of Ghana.

== History ==
The state of the nation address was first implemented under the administration of John Kufuor. Records show that in 18 years at the helm of Ghana, President Jerry John Rawlings did not deliver a State of the Nation address contrary to the provisions of the national constitution. Former president John Agyekum Kufuor, was the first president to deliver the state of the nation address in Ghana hence sticking rigidly to the letter of the constitution, which says the president should give a State of the Nation address at the beginning and close of every parliamentary session. Since then The state of the nation has been in existence.

== Timeline of speeches ==
YEAR	DELIVERED BY	LINK TO DOCUMENT	TOPIC/TITLE OF SPEECH	COMMENTS/DESCRIPTION
2001	John Agyekum Kufour			
2002	John Agyekum Kufour			
2003	John Agyekum Kufour	to document		
2004	John Agyekum Kufour			
2005	John Agyekum Kufour	to document		
2006	John Agyekum Kufour	to document		
2007	John Agyekum Kufour	Link to document		
2008	John Agyekum Kufour	Link to document		
2009	John Evans Atta Mills	Link to document	Rescue Plan For a Better Ghana	
2010	John Evans Atta Mills	Link to document	Partners In Vision	
2011	John Evans Atta Mills	Link to the document	Raising Ghana to the next level	
2012	John Evans Atta Mills	Link to the document	Still Building a Better Ghana	
2013	John Dramani Mahama	Link to the document	Advancing the Better Ghana Agenda - Opportunities for Growth	
2014	John Dramani Mahama	Link to the document		
2015	John Dramani Mahama	Link to the document		
2016	John Dramani Mahama	Link to the document		
2017	John Dramani Mahama	Link to document		2017 (Nana Akuffo Addo)
2018	Nana Akuffo Addo	To full text		
2019	Nana Akuffo Addo	To full text.		2019 (Nana Akuffo Addo)
2020	Nana Akuffo Addo	To full text.		2020 (Nana Akuffo Addo)
2021	Nana Akuffo Addo	Link to document		

== See also ==
- State of the Union Address in the United States
- Speeches by heads of state
