= Moscow Gostiny Dvor =

Coordinates: 55°45′13″N 37°37′32″E

The Old Merchant Court (Russian: Старый гостиный двор, Stary gostiny dvor) in Moscow occupies a substantial portion of Kitai-gorod, as the old merchant district is known. It is located near the famous Red Square, a few hundred metres away from it. Formerly accommodating both shops and warehouses, it was constructed of brick in the 1590s and underwent significant modifications from 1638–1641. As the Russian capital expanded and the old structure became overcrowded, a new indoor market was completed nearby in 1665.

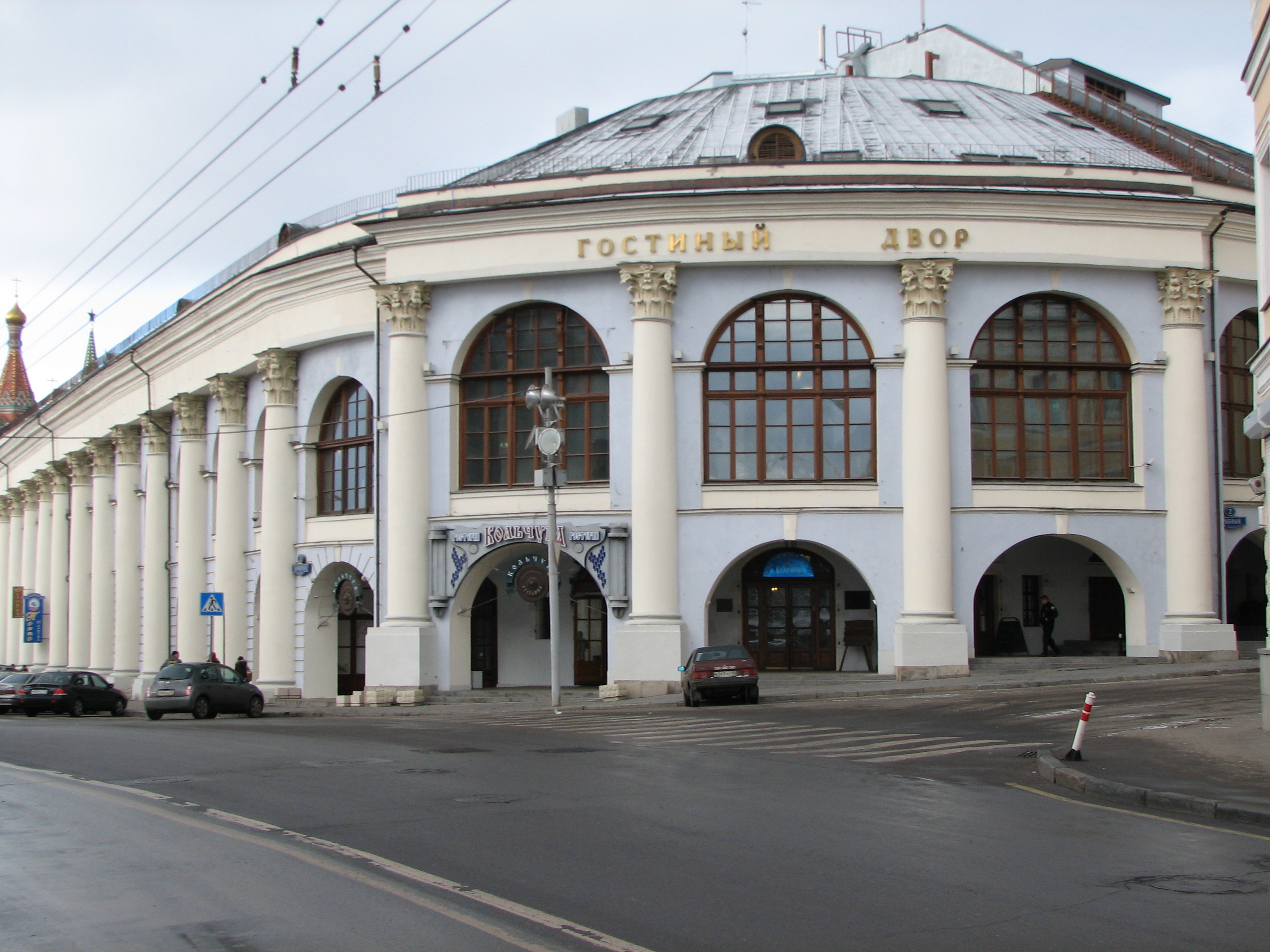
The Gostiny Dvor in Moscow. The belfry of St. Basil's Cathedral can be seen in the background.

Giacomo Quarenghi, the favored architect of Catherine the Great, in 1789 replaced those medieval buildings with a new shopping mall designed in a sober Neoclassical style with innumerable Corinthian columns and arcades. Several local Moscow architects including S. Karin, I. Egotov and P. Selihov supervised the actual construction. The first phase was delayed because of the death of Catherine the Great and was not completed until 1805. Osip Bove made some modifications to adapt to the slope in the area and to finish following Quarenghi's original plans in 1830.

Subsequently, Quarenghi's structure went through many reconstructions. After the Revolution in 1923, the space was subdivided into offices altering the original design significantly. In 1995 a modern glass roof was installed, when the building was being converted into a fashionable exhibition ground. Nowadays, the edifice is used as the setting for fashion shows, business parties, and even Viennese balls. Montserrat Caballé and José Carreras were among those who performed at the New Year parties in Gostiny Dvor.

During the 1995 renovations, much archeological work was done on the site. A small museum was established to exhibit some of the numerous finds which include the contents of a pantry from a 17th-century merchant home that had been destroyed by fire. The exhibit hall is open for the public, Monday through Saturday from 11 a.m. until 5 p.m.
