= State of the State address =

Annual speech by US state governors

Gov. Rudy Perpich of Minnesota delivers his State of the State address for 1983

The State of the State address is a speech customarily given annually by state governors in each of the 50 U.S. federated states (although the terminology for this speech differs for some states: in Iowa it is known as the Condition of the State Address; in Kentucky, Massachusetts, and Virginia it is called the State of the Commonwealth Address; in Pennsylvania it is known as the Governor's Budget Address). The speech is customarily delivered before both houses of the state legislature sitting in joint session, with the exception of the Nebraska Legislature, which is a unicameral body. The speech is given to satisfy a constitutional stipulation that a governor must report annually, or in older constitutions described as being "from time to time", on the state or condition of a state.

The potentially unclear name reflects the dual meanings of the word "state"; the first refers to the general condition of a thing, and the second refers to the political conception of a state.

The mayor of the District of Columbia gives a State of the District address. There are also many cities in the United States in which the mayor gives a State of the City address. Some American counties have county executives give a State of the County or Parish address, though these are much more rare.

The analogous address given by the president of the United States is known as the State of the Union address.
